

561001–561100 

|-bgcolor=#fefefe
| 561001 ||  || — || September 12, 2002 || Palomar || NEAT ||  || align=right data-sort-value="0.60" | 600 m || 
|-id=002 bgcolor=#fefefe
| 561002 ||  || — || November 6, 2012 || Kitt Peak || Spacewatch ||  || align=right data-sort-value="0.71" | 710 m || 
|-id=003 bgcolor=#fefefe
| 561003 ||  || — || July 26, 2008 || Siding Spring || SSS ||  || align=right data-sort-value="0.76" | 760 m || 
|-id=004 bgcolor=#fefefe
| 561004 ||  || — || July 14, 2015 || Haleakala || Pan-STARRS ||  || align=right data-sort-value="0.70" | 700 m || 
|-id=005 bgcolor=#d6d6d6
| 561005 ||  || — || September 6, 2010 || Mount Lemmon || Mount Lemmon Survey ||  || align=right | 2.6 km || 
|-id=006 bgcolor=#fefefe
| 561006 ||  || — || August 27, 2005 || Anderson Mesa || LONEOS ||  || align=right data-sort-value="0.58" | 580 m || 
|-id=007 bgcolor=#fefefe
| 561007 ||  || — || October 15, 2012 || Kitt Peak || Spacewatch ||  || align=right data-sort-value="0.93" | 930 m || 
|-id=008 bgcolor=#fefefe
| 561008 ||  || — || January 11, 2003 || Kitt Peak || Spacewatch ||  || align=right data-sort-value="0.91" | 910 m || 
|-id=009 bgcolor=#fefefe
| 561009 ||  || — || June 28, 2011 || Mount Lemmon || Mount Lemmon Survey ||  || align=right data-sort-value="0.70" | 700 m || 
|-id=010 bgcolor=#fefefe
| 561010 ||  || — || October 16, 2012 || Mount Lemmon || Mount Lemmon Survey ||  || align=right data-sort-value="0.60" | 600 m || 
|-id=011 bgcolor=#fefefe
| 561011 ||  || — || October 7, 2012 || Haleakala || Pan-STARRS ||  || align=right data-sort-value="0.67" | 670 m || 
|-id=012 bgcolor=#fefefe
| 561012 ||  || — || February 25, 2011 || Mount Lemmon || Mount Lemmon Survey ||  || align=right data-sort-value="0.67" | 670 m || 
|-id=013 bgcolor=#fefefe
| 561013 ||  || — || October 24, 2009 || Kitt Peak || Spacewatch ||  || align=right data-sort-value="0.63" | 630 m || 
|-id=014 bgcolor=#fefefe
| 561014 ||  || — || October 7, 1996 || Kitt Peak || Spacewatch ||  || align=right data-sort-value="0.72" | 720 m || 
|-id=015 bgcolor=#fefefe
| 561015 ||  || — || September 19, 2012 || Mount Lemmon || Mount Lemmon Survey ||  || align=right data-sort-value="0.62" | 620 m || 
|-id=016 bgcolor=#fefefe
| 561016 ||  || — || February 7, 2008 || Kitt Peak || Spacewatch ||  || align=right data-sort-value="0.61" | 610 m || 
|-id=017 bgcolor=#fefefe
| 561017 ||  || — || June 27, 2015 || Haleakala || Pan-STARRS ||  || align=right data-sort-value="0.67" | 670 m || 
|-id=018 bgcolor=#fefefe
| 561018 ||  || — || August 23, 2004 || Kitt Peak || Spacewatch ||  || align=right data-sort-value="0.59" | 590 m || 
|-id=019 bgcolor=#fefefe
| 561019 ||  || — || October 6, 2012 || Haleakala || Pan-STARRS ||  || align=right data-sort-value="0.66" | 660 m || 
|-id=020 bgcolor=#fefefe
| 561020 ||  || — || October 21, 2012 || Haleakala || Pan-STARRS ||  || align=right data-sort-value="0.64" | 640 m || 
|-id=021 bgcolor=#fefefe
| 561021 ||  || — || October 20, 2012 || Haleakala || Pan-STARRS ||  || align=right data-sort-value="0.66" | 660 m || 
|-id=022 bgcolor=#d6d6d6
| 561022 ||  || — || August 11, 2002 || Palomar || NEAT || 7:4 || align=right | 4.3 km || 
|-id=023 bgcolor=#fefefe
| 561023 ||  || — || August 4, 2008 || Siding Spring || SSS ||  || align=right data-sort-value="0.81" | 810 m || 
|-id=024 bgcolor=#fefefe
| 561024 ||  || — || April 3, 2002 || Kitt Peak || Spacewatch ||  || align=right data-sort-value="0.53" | 530 m || 
|-id=025 bgcolor=#fefefe
| 561025 ||  || — || March 24, 2014 || Haleakala || Pan-STARRS ||  || align=right data-sort-value="0.82" | 820 m || 
|-id=026 bgcolor=#fefefe
| 561026 ||  || — || February 21, 2007 || Vail-Jarnac || Jarnac Obs. ||  || align=right data-sort-value="0.94" | 940 m || 
|-id=027 bgcolor=#fefefe
| 561027 ||  || — || March 6, 2011 || Kitt Peak || Spacewatch ||  || align=right data-sort-value="0.59" | 590 m || 
|-id=028 bgcolor=#fefefe
| 561028 ||  || — || September 13, 2005 || Kitt Peak || Spacewatch ||  || align=right data-sort-value="0.86" | 860 m || 
|-id=029 bgcolor=#fefefe
| 561029 ||  || — || April 23, 2007 || Mount Lemmon || Mount Lemmon Survey ||  || align=right data-sort-value="0.65" | 650 m || 
|-id=030 bgcolor=#E9E9E9
| 561030 ||  || — || January 10, 2008 || Catalina || CSS ||  || align=right | 1.3 km || 
|-id=031 bgcolor=#fefefe
| 561031 ||  || — || June 17, 2015 || Haleakala || Pan-STARRS ||  || align=right data-sort-value="0.72" | 720 m || 
|-id=032 bgcolor=#fefefe
| 561032 ||  || — || January 25, 2007 || Kitt Peak || Spacewatch ||  || align=right data-sort-value="0.69" | 690 m || 
|-id=033 bgcolor=#fefefe
| 561033 ||  || — || January 4, 2006 || Kitt Peak || Spacewatch ||  || align=right data-sort-value="0.61" | 610 m || 
|-id=034 bgcolor=#E9E9E9
| 561034 ||  || — || February 27, 2008 || Catalina || CSS ||  || align=right | 1.7 km || 
|-id=035 bgcolor=#fefefe
| 561035 ||  || — || August 9, 2015 || Haleakala || Pan-STARRS ||  || align=right data-sort-value="0.68" | 680 m || 
|-id=036 bgcolor=#fefefe
| 561036 ||  || — || October 8, 2008 || Mount Lemmon || Mount Lemmon Survey ||  || align=right data-sort-value="0.80" | 800 m || 
|-id=037 bgcolor=#E9E9E9
| 561037 ||  || — || August 8, 2015 || Haleakala || Pan-STARRS ||  || align=right | 1.2 km || 
|-id=038 bgcolor=#fefefe
| 561038 ||  || — || July 19, 2015 || Haleakala || Pan-STARRS ||  || align=right data-sort-value="0.58" | 580 m || 
|-id=039 bgcolor=#fefefe
| 561039 ||  || — || December 21, 2006 || Kitt Peak || Spacewatch ||  || align=right data-sort-value="0.67" | 670 m || 
|-id=040 bgcolor=#fefefe
| 561040 ||  || — || April 14, 2008 || Kitt Peak || Spacewatch ||  || align=right data-sort-value="0.52" | 520 m || 
|-id=041 bgcolor=#fefefe
| 561041 ||  || — || April 14, 2008 || Mount Lemmon || Mount Lemmon Survey ||  || align=right data-sort-value="0.59" | 590 m || 
|-id=042 bgcolor=#fefefe
| 561042 ||  || — || February 26, 2014 || Haleakala || Pan-STARRS ||  || align=right data-sort-value="0.62" | 620 m || 
|-id=043 bgcolor=#fefefe
| 561043 ||  || — || October 16, 2012 || Mount Lemmon || Mount Lemmon Survey ||  || align=right data-sort-value="0.60" | 600 m || 
|-id=044 bgcolor=#fefefe
| 561044 ||  || — || October 15, 2001 || Kitt Peak || Spacewatch ||  || align=right data-sort-value="0.54" | 540 m || 
|-id=045 bgcolor=#fefefe
| 561045 ||  || — || October 26, 2009 || Kitt Peak || Spacewatch ||  || align=right data-sort-value="0.49" | 490 m || 
|-id=046 bgcolor=#fefefe
| 561046 ||  || — || October 6, 2012 || Haleakala || Pan-STARRS ||  || align=right data-sort-value="0.57" | 570 m || 
|-id=047 bgcolor=#fefefe
| 561047 ||  || — || September 26, 2005 || Kitt Peak || Spacewatch ||  || align=right data-sort-value="0.65" | 650 m || 
|-id=048 bgcolor=#fefefe
| 561048 ||  || — || August 10, 2015 || Haleakala || Pan-STARRS ||  || align=right data-sort-value="0.60" | 600 m || 
|-id=049 bgcolor=#d6d6d6
| 561049 ||  || — || March 11, 2005 || Mount Lemmon || Mount Lemmon Survey || 3:2 || align=right | 4.4 km || 
|-id=050 bgcolor=#fefefe
| 561050 ||  || — || October 12, 2009 || Mount Lemmon || Mount Lemmon Survey ||  || align=right data-sort-value="0.74" | 740 m || 
|-id=051 bgcolor=#fefefe
| 561051 ||  || — || July 19, 2015 || Haleakala || Pan-STARRS ||  || align=right data-sort-value="0.69" | 690 m || 
|-id=052 bgcolor=#fefefe
| 561052 ||  || — || January 25, 2014 || Haleakala || Pan-STARRS ||  || align=right data-sort-value="0.49" | 490 m || 
|-id=053 bgcolor=#fefefe
| 561053 ||  || — || September 21, 2008 || Kitt Peak || Spacewatch ||  || align=right | 1.0 km || 
|-id=054 bgcolor=#E9E9E9
| 561054 ||  || — || March 8, 2005 || Mount Lemmon || Mount Lemmon Survey ||  || align=right | 1.3 km || 
|-id=055 bgcolor=#fefefe
| 561055 ||  || — || January 11, 2010 || Kitt Peak || Spacewatch ||  || align=right data-sort-value="0.59" | 590 m || 
|-id=056 bgcolor=#fefefe
| 561056 ||  || — || July 25, 2015 || Haleakala || Pan-STARRS ||  || align=right data-sort-value="0.76" | 760 m || 
|-id=057 bgcolor=#fefefe
| 561057 ||  || — || February 26, 2007 || Mount Lemmon || Mount Lemmon Survey ||  || align=right data-sort-value="0.67" | 670 m || 
|-id=058 bgcolor=#fefefe
| 561058 ||  || — || November 4, 2012 || Mount Lemmon || Mount Lemmon Survey ||  || align=right data-sort-value="0.58" | 580 m || 
|-id=059 bgcolor=#fefefe
| 561059 ||  || — || September 27, 2008 || Mount Lemmon || Mount Lemmon Survey ||  || align=right data-sort-value="0.58" | 580 m || 
|-id=060 bgcolor=#E9E9E9
| 561060 ||  || — || August 28, 2006 || Kitt Peak || Spacewatch ||  || align=right | 1.6 km || 
|-id=061 bgcolor=#fefefe
| 561061 ||  || — || August 4, 2005 || Palomar || NEAT ||  || align=right data-sort-value="0.70" | 700 m || 
|-id=062 bgcolor=#E9E9E9
| 561062 ||  || — || September 12, 2007 || Mount Lemmon || Mount Lemmon Survey ||  || align=right data-sort-value="0.74" | 740 m || 
|-id=063 bgcolor=#fefefe
| 561063 ||  || — || August 10, 2015 || Haleakala || Pan-STARRS ||  || align=right data-sort-value="0.56" | 560 m || 
|-id=064 bgcolor=#E9E9E9
| 561064 ||  || — || February 1, 2009 || Kitt Peak || Spacewatch ||  || align=right | 1.1 km || 
|-id=065 bgcolor=#fefefe
| 561065 ||  || — || September 23, 2008 || Mount Lemmon || Mount Lemmon Survey ||  || align=right data-sort-value="0.67" | 670 m || 
|-id=066 bgcolor=#fefefe
| 561066 ||  || — || November 17, 2012 || Kitt Peak || Spacewatch ||  || align=right data-sort-value="0.56" | 560 m || 
|-id=067 bgcolor=#d6d6d6
| 561067 ||  || — || January 2, 2012 || Mount Lemmon || Mount Lemmon Survey || 7:4 || align=right | 3.0 km || 
|-id=068 bgcolor=#fefefe
| 561068 ||  || — || August 10, 2015 || Haleakala || Pan-STARRS ||  || align=right data-sort-value="0.61" | 610 m || 
|-id=069 bgcolor=#fefefe
| 561069 ||  || — || January 6, 2010 || Kitt Peak || Spacewatch ||  || align=right data-sort-value="0.53" | 530 m || 
|-id=070 bgcolor=#fefefe
| 561070 ||  || — || August 10, 2015 || Haleakala || Pan-STARRS ||  || align=right data-sort-value="0.69" | 690 m || 
|-id=071 bgcolor=#fefefe
| 561071 ||  || — || September 18, 1995 || Kitt Peak || Spacewatch ||  || align=right data-sort-value="0.48" | 480 m || 
|-id=072 bgcolor=#fefefe
| 561072 ||  || — || May 31, 2011 || Mount Lemmon || Mount Lemmon Survey ||  || align=right data-sort-value="0.57" | 570 m || 
|-id=073 bgcolor=#fefefe
| 561073 ||  || — || October 24, 2008 || Mount Lemmon || Mount Lemmon Survey ||  || align=right data-sort-value="0.62" | 620 m || 
|-id=074 bgcolor=#d6d6d6
| 561074 ||  || — || August 10, 2015 || Haleakala || Pan-STARRS || 3:2 || align=right | 3.6 km || 
|-id=075 bgcolor=#fefefe
| 561075 ||  || — || November 30, 2005 || Kitt Peak || Spacewatch || V || align=right data-sort-value="0.53" | 530 m || 
|-id=076 bgcolor=#fefefe
| 561076 ||  || — || April 6, 2011 || Kitt Peak || Spacewatch ||  || align=right data-sort-value="0.72" | 720 m || 
|-id=077 bgcolor=#fefefe
| 561077 ||  || — || December 10, 2009 || Mount Lemmon || Mount Lemmon Survey ||  || align=right data-sort-value="0.70" | 700 m || 
|-id=078 bgcolor=#fefefe
| 561078 ||  || — || October 9, 2012 || Charleston || R. Holmes ||  || align=right data-sort-value="0.56" | 560 m || 
|-id=079 bgcolor=#fefefe
| 561079 ||  || — || October 20, 2012 || Haleakala || Pan-STARRS ||  || align=right data-sort-value="0.67" | 670 m || 
|-id=080 bgcolor=#fefefe
| 561080 ||  || — || October 16, 2012 || Mount Lemmon || Mount Lemmon Survey ||  || align=right data-sort-value="0.97" | 970 m || 
|-id=081 bgcolor=#fefefe
| 561081 ||  || — || December 3, 2005 || Mauna Kea || Mauna Kea Obs. ||  || align=right | 1.0 km || 
|-id=082 bgcolor=#fefefe
| 561082 ||  || — || September 13, 2002 || Palomar || NEAT ||  || align=right data-sort-value="0.62" | 620 m || 
|-id=083 bgcolor=#fefefe
| 561083 ||  || — || November 11, 2012 || Nogales || M. Schwartz, P. R. Holvorcem ||  || align=right data-sort-value="0.68" | 680 m || 
|-id=084 bgcolor=#fefefe
| 561084 ||  || — || February 9, 2014 || Haleakala || Pan-STARRS ||  || align=right data-sort-value="0.67" | 670 m || 
|-id=085 bgcolor=#fefefe
| 561085 ||  || — || July 30, 2008 || Kitt Peak || Spacewatch ||  || align=right data-sort-value="0.77" | 770 m || 
|-id=086 bgcolor=#FA8072
| 561086 ||  || — || May 3, 2008 || Mount Lemmon || Mount Lemmon Survey ||  || align=right data-sort-value="0.47" | 470 m || 
|-id=087 bgcolor=#d6d6d6
| 561087 ||  || — || August 10, 2015 || Haleakala || Pan-STARRS ||  || align=right | 2.4 km || 
|-id=088 bgcolor=#fefefe
| 561088 ||  || — || February 10, 2014 || Mount Lemmon || Mount Lemmon Survey ||  || align=right data-sort-value="0.66" | 660 m || 
|-id=089 bgcolor=#fefefe
| 561089 ||  || — || February 5, 2000 || Kitt Peak || Spacewatch ||  || align=right data-sort-value="0.87" | 870 m || 
|-id=090 bgcolor=#fefefe
| 561090 ||  || — || September 21, 2012 || Mount Lemmon || Mount Lemmon Survey ||  || align=right data-sort-value="0.55" | 550 m || 
|-id=091 bgcolor=#fefefe
| 561091 ||  || — || February 4, 2006 || Kitt Peak || Spacewatch ||  || align=right data-sort-value="0.62" | 620 m || 
|-id=092 bgcolor=#fefefe
| 561092 ||  || — || September 28, 2001 || Palomar || NEAT ||  || align=right data-sort-value="0.82" | 820 m || 
|-id=093 bgcolor=#fefefe
| 561093 ||  || — || December 27, 2005 || Catalina || CSS ||  || align=right data-sort-value="0.74" | 740 m || 
|-id=094 bgcolor=#fefefe
| 561094 ||  || — || October 18, 2012 || Haleakala || Pan-STARRS ||  || align=right data-sort-value="0.47" | 470 m || 
|-id=095 bgcolor=#fefefe
| 561095 ||  || — || December 20, 2009 || Mount Lemmon || Mount Lemmon Survey ||  || align=right data-sort-value="0.87" | 870 m || 
|-id=096 bgcolor=#fefefe
| 561096 ||  || — || October 9, 2012 || Mount Lemmon || Mount Lemmon Survey ||  || align=right data-sort-value="0.60" | 600 m || 
|-id=097 bgcolor=#fefefe
| 561097 ||  || — || October 18, 2012 || Haleakala || Pan-STARRS ||  || align=right data-sort-value="0.61" | 610 m || 
|-id=098 bgcolor=#fefefe
| 561098 ||  || — || October 7, 2004 || Kitt Peak || Spacewatch ||  || align=right data-sort-value="0.62" | 620 m || 
|-id=099 bgcolor=#fefefe
| 561099 ||  || — || November 10, 2004 || Kitt Peak || Spacewatch ||  || align=right data-sort-value="0.69" | 690 m || 
|-id=100 bgcolor=#fefefe
| 561100 ||  || — || October 20, 2012 || Haleakala || Pan-STARRS ||  || align=right data-sort-value="0.65" | 650 m || 
|}

561101–561200 

|-bgcolor=#d6d6d6
| 561101 ||  || — || April 18, 2013 || Mount Lemmon || Mount Lemmon Survey || 7:4 || align=right | 3.7 km || 
|-id=102 bgcolor=#fefefe
| 561102 ||  || — || October 2, 2008 || Mount Lemmon || Mount Lemmon Survey ||  || align=right data-sort-value="0.79" | 790 m || 
|-id=103 bgcolor=#fefefe
| 561103 ||  || — || October 4, 2008 || Catalina || CSS ||  || align=right data-sort-value="0.80" | 800 m || 
|-id=104 bgcolor=#E9E9E9
| 561104 ||  || — || August 12, 2015 || Haleakala || Pan-STARRS ||  || align=right data-sort-value="0.88" | 880 m || 
|-id=105 bgcolor=#fefefe
| 561105 ||  || — || March 30, 2011 || Bergisch Gladbach || W. Bickel ||  || align=right data-sort-value="0.67" | 670 m || 
|-id=106 bgcolor=#fefefe
| 561106 ||  || — || December 3, 2012 || Mount Lemmon || Mount Lemmon Survey ||  || align=right data-sort-value="0.61" | 610 m || 
|-id=107 bgcolor=#fefefe
| 561107 ||  || — || November 25, 2009 || Kitt Peak || Spacewatch ||  || align=right data-sort-value="0.63" | 630 m || 
|-id=108 bgcolor=#fefefe
| 561108 ||  || — || August 13, 2015 || Haleakala || Pan-STARRS ||  || align=right data-sort-value="0.67" | 670 m || 
|-id=109 bgcolor=#fefefe
| 561109 ||  || — || September 6, 2008 || Catalina || CSS ||  || align=right data-sort-value="0.81" | 810 m || 
|-id=110 bgcolor=#fefefe
| 561110 ||  || — || April 28, 2011 || Haleakala || Pan-STARRS ||  || align=right data-sort-value="0.83" | 830 m || 
|-id=111 bgcolor=#fefefe
| 561111 ||  || — || February 25, 2011 || Kitt Peak || Spacewatch ||  || align=right data-sort-value="0.92" | 920 m || 
|-id=112 bgcolor=#fefefe
| 561112 ||  || — || May 4, 2008 || Kitt Peak || Spacewatch ||  || align=right data-sort-value="0.66" | 660 m || 
|-id=113 bgcolor=#fefefe
| 561113 ||  || — || February 9, 2013 || Haleakala || Pan-STARRS ||  || align=right data-sort-value="0.79" | 790 m || 
|-id=114 bgcolor=#fefefe
| 561114 ||  || — || April 14, 2010 || Mount Lemmon || Mount Lemmon Survey ||  || align=right | 1.2 km || 
|-id=115 bgcolor=#fefefe
| 561115 ||  || — || February 26, 2014 || Haleakala || Pan-STARRS ||  || align=right data-sort-value="0.69" | 690 m || 
|-id=116 bgcolor=#fefefe
| 561116 ||  || — || November 4, 2005 || Mount Lemmon || Mount Lemmon Survey ||  || align=right data-sort-value="0.62" | 620 m || 
|-id=117 bgcolor=#fefefe
| 561117 ||  || — || September 26, 2000 || Kitt Peak || SDSS ||  || align=right | 1.4 km || 
|-id=118 bgcolor=#fefefe
| 561118 ||  || — || May 1, 2011 || Haleakala || Pan-STARRS ||  || align=right data-sort-value="0.65" | 650 m || 
|-id=119 bgcolor=#E9E9E9
| 561119 ||  || — || January 15, 1996 || Kitt Peak || Spacewatch ||  || align=right data-sort-value="0.87" | 870 m || 
|-id=120 bgcolor=#fefefe
| 561120 ||  || — || December 25, 2009 || Kitt Peak || Spacewatch ||  || align=right data-sort-value="0.70" | 700 m || 
|-id=121 bgcolor=#E9E9E9
| 561121 ||  || — || May 6, 2014 || Haleakala || Pan-STARRS ||  || align=right data-sort-value="0.94" | 940 m || 
|-id=122 bgcolor=#fefefe
| 561122 ||  || — || August 9, 2015 || Haleakala || Pan-STARRS ||  || align=right data-sort-value="0.59" | 590 m || 
|-id=123 bgcolor=#fefefe
| 561123 ||  || — || August 9, 2015 || Haleakala || Pan-STARRS ||  || align=right data-sort-value="0.75" | 750 m || 
|-id=124 bgcolor=#E9E9E9
| 561124 ||  || — || August 11, 2015 || Haleakala || Pan-STARRS ||  || align=right data-sort-value="0.86" | 860 m || 
|-id=125 bgcolor=#fefefe
| 561125 ||  || — || April 5, 2014 || Haleakala || Pan-STARRS ||  || align=right data-sort-value="0.74" | 740 m || 
|-id=126 bgcolor=#fefefe
| 561126 ||  || — || September 12, 2007 || Kitt Peak || Spacewatch ||  || align=right data-sort-value="0.73" | 730 m || 
|-id=127 bgcolor=#fefefe
| 561127 ||  || — || August 9, 2015 || Haleakala || Pan-STARRS ||  || align=right data-sort-value="0.89" | 890 m || 
|-id=128 bgcolor=#fefefe
| 561128 ||  || — || June 20, 2015 || Haleakala || Pan-STARRS ||  || align=right data-sort-value="0.73" | 730 m || 
|-id=129 bgcolor=#fefefe
| 561129 ||  || — || March 11, 2011 || Mount Lemmon || Mount Lemmon Survey ||  || align=right data-sort-value="0.59" | 590 m || 
|-id=130 bgcolor=#fefefe
| 561130 ||  || — || December 16, 2009 || Mount Lemmon || Mount Lemmon Survey ||  || align=right data-sort-value="0.70" | 700 m || 
|-id=131 bgcolor=#fefefe
| 561131 ||  || — || January 16, 2007 || Mount Lemmon || Mount Lemmon Survey ||  || align=right data-sort-value="0.63" | 630 m || 
|-id=132 bgcolor=#E9E9E9
| 561132 ||  || — || August 28, 2015 || Haleakala || Pan-STARRS ||  || align=right | 1.3 km || 
|-id=133 bgcolor=#E9E9E9
| 561133 ||  || — || October 24, 2011 || Haleakala || Pan-STARRS ||  || align=right | 1.5 km || 
|-id=134 bgcolor=#fefefe
| 561134 ||  || — || May 7, 2014 || Haleakala || Pan-STARRS ||  || align=right data-sort-value="0.70" | 700 m || 
|-id=135 bgcolor=#fefefe
| 561135 ||  || — || October 9, 2008 || Kitt Peak || Spacewatch ||  || align=right data-sort-value="0.58" | 580 m || 
|-id=136 bgcolor=#E9E9E9
| 561136 ||  || — || August 21, 2015 || Haleakala || Pan-STARRS ||  || align=right | 1.3 km || 
|-id=137 bgcolor=#fefefe
| 561137 ||  || — || March 5, 2008 || Kitt Peak || Spacewatch ||  || align=right data-sort-value="0.56" | 560 m || 
|-id=138 bgcolor=#fefefe
| 561138 ||  || — || March 16, 2004 || Kitt Peak || Spacewatch ||  || align=right data-sort-value="0.77" | 770 m || 
|-id=139 bgcolor=#fefefe
| 561139 ||  || — || December 12, 2012 || Mount Lemmon || Mount Lemmon Survey ||  || align=right data-sort-value="0.61" | 610 m || 
|-id=140 bgcolor=#fefefe
| 561140 ||  || — || April 5, 2011 || Kitt Peak || Spacewatch ||  || align=right data-sort-value="0.56" | 560 m || 
|-id=141 bgcolor=#fefefe
| 561141 ||  || — || December 31, 2008 || La Silla || Mount Lemmon Survey ||  || align=right data-sort-value="0.81" | 810 m || 
|-id=142 bgcolor=#fefefe
| 561142 ||  || — || October 19, 1995 || Kitt Peak || Spacewatch ||  || align=right data-sort-value="0.54" | 540 m || 
|-id=143 bgcolor=#fefefe
| 561143 ||  || — || July 25, 2015 || Haleakala || Pan-STARRS ||  || align=right data-sort-value="0.76" | 760 m || 
|-id=144 bgcolor=#fefefe
| 561144 ||  || — || March 30, 2011 || Mount Lemmon || Mount Lemmon Survey ||  || align=right data-sort-value="0.55" | 550 m || 
|-id=145 bgcolor=#fefefe
| 561145 ||  || — || May 8, 2014 || Haleakala || Pan-STARRS ||  || align=right data-sort-value="0.58" | 580 m || 
|-id=146 bgcolor=#fefefe
| 561146 ||  || — || September 7, 2004 || Kitt Peak || Spacewatch ||  || align=right data-sort-value="0.72" | 720 m || 
|-id=147 bgcolor=#fefefe
| 561147 ||  || — || January 18, 2013 || Kitt Peak || Spacewatch ||  || align=right data-sort-value="0.76" | 760 m || 
|-id=148 bgcolor=#fefefe
| 561148 ||  || — || September 6, 2008 || Mount Lemmon || Mount Lemmon Survey ||  || align=right data-sort-value="0.64" | 640 m || 
|-id=149 bgcolor=#fefefe
| 561149 ||  || — || July 22, 2001 || Palomar || NEAT ||  || align=right data-sort-value="0.91" | 910 m || 
|-id=150 bgcolor=#fefefe
| 561150 ||  || — || October 30, 2005 || Kitt Peak || Spacewatch ||  || align=right data-sort-value="0.69" | 690 m || 
|-id=151 bgcolor=#fefefe
| 561151 ||  || — || January 26, 2009 || Mount Lemmon || Mount Lemmon Survey ||  || align=right data-sort-value="0.82" | 820 m || 
|-id=152 bgcolor=#E9E9E9
| 561152 ||  || — || September 25, 2007 || Mount Lemmon || Mount Lemmon Survey ||  || align=right | 1.2 km || 
|-id=153 bgcolor=#fefefe
| 561153 ||  || — || March 20, 2007 || Mount Lemmon || Mount Lemmon Survey ||  || align=right data-sort-value="0.66" | 660 m || 
|-id=154 bgcolor=#fefefe
| 561154 ||  || — || October 6, 2008 || Mount Lemmon || Mount Lemmon Survey ||  || align=right data-sort-value="0.80" | 800 m || 
|-id=155 bgcolor=#fefefe
| 561155 ||  || — || August 25, 2005 || Palomar || NEAT ||  || align=right data-sort-value="0.62" | 620 m || 
|-id=156 bgcolor=#fefefe
| 561156 ||  || — || February 6, 2013 || Nogales || M. Schwartz, P. R. Holvorcem ||  || align=right data-sort-value="0.98" | 980 m || 
|-id=157 bgcolor=#E9E9E9
| 561157 ||  || — || September 12, 1994 || Kitt Peak || Spacewatch ||  || align=right | 1.3 km || 
|-id=158 bgcolor=#E9E9E9
| 561158 ||  || — || September 8, 2015 || XuYi || PMO NEO ||  || align=right data-sort-value="0.89" | 890 m || 
|-id=159 bgcolor=#fefefe
| 561159 ||  || — || August 24, 2011 || Haleakala || Pan-STARRS ||  || align=right data-sort-value="0.69" | 690 m || 
|-id=160 bgcolor=#fefefe
| 561160 ||  || — || November 4, 2008 || Vail-Jarnac || Jarnac Obs. ||  || align=right data-sort-value="0.89" | 890 m || 
|-id=161 bgcolor=#E9E9E9
| 561161 ||  || — || February 5, 2013 || Kitt Peak || Spacewatch ||  || align=right | 1.5 km || 
|-id=162 bgcolor=#fefefe
| 561162 ||  || — || October 30, 2005 || Mount Lemmon || Mount Lemmon Survey ||  || align=right data-sort-value="0.64" | 640 m || 
|-id=163 bgcolor=#fefefe
| 561163 ||  || — || September 19, 2008 || Kitt Peak || Spacewatch ||  || align=right data-sort-value="0.61" | 610 m || 
|-id=164 bgcolor=#fefefe
| 561164 ||  || — || July 28, 2015 || Haleakala || Pan-STARRS ||  || align=right data-sort-value="0.68" | 680 m || 
|-id=165 bgcolor=#E9E9E9
| 561165 ||  || — || March 14, 2013 || Kitt Peak || Spacewatch ||  || align=right data-sort-value="0.86" | 860 m || 
|-id=166 bgcolor=#fefefe
| 561166 ||  || — || March 13, 2007 || Mount Lemmon || Mount Lemmon Survey ||  || align=right data-sort-value="0.81" | 810 m || 
|-id=167 bgcolor=#fefefe
| 561167 ||  || — || July 27, 2011 || Haleakala || Pan-STARRS ||  || align=right data-sort-value="0.76" | 760 m || 
|-id=168 bgcolor=#E9E9E9
| 561168 ||  || — || July 25, 2015 || Haleakala || Pan-STARRS ||  || align=right data-sort-value="0.56" | 560 m || 
|-id=169 bgcolor=#fefefe
| 561169 ||  || — || January 3, 2013 || Haleakala || Pan-STARRS ||  || align=right data-sort-value="0.92" | 920 m || 
|-id=170 bgcolor=#fefefe
| 561170 ||  || — || November 20, 2008 || Mount Lemmon || Mount Lemmon Survey ||  || align=right data-sort-value="0.56" | 560 m || 
|-id=171 bgcolor=#fefefe
| 561171 ||  || — || March 13, 2007 || Kitt Peak || Spacewatch ||  || align=right data-sort-value="0.66" | 660 m || 
|-id=172 bgcolor=#fefefe
| 561172 ||  || — || May 26, 2006 || Mount Lemmon || Mount Lemmon Survey ||  || align=right data-sort-value="0.76" | 760 m || 
|-id=173 bgcolor=#fefefe
| 561173 ||  || — || December 20, 2004 || Mount Lemmon || Mount Lemmon Survey ||  || align=right data-sort-value="0.75" | 750 m || 
|-id=174 bgcolor=#fefefe
| 561174 ||  || — || April 13, 2004 || Kitt Peak || Spacewatch ||  || align=right data-sort-value="0.54" | 540 m || 
|-id=175 bgcolor=#fefefe
| 561175 ||  || — || September 10, 2015 || Haleakala || Pan-STARRS ||  || align=right data-sort-value="0.66" | 660 m || 
|-id=176 bgcolor=#fefefe
| 561176 ||  || — || February 23, 2003 || Kitt Peak || Spacewatch ||  || align=right data-sort-value="0.78" | 780 m || 
|-id=177 bgcolor=#fefefe
| 561177 ||  || — || October 6, 2004 || Kitt Peak || Spacewatch ||  || align=right data-sort-value="0.56" | 560 m || 
|-id=178 bgcolor=#E9E9E9
| 561178 ||  || — || September 26, 2006 || Mount Lemmon || Mount Lemmon Survey ||  || align=right | 1.5 km || 
|-id=179 bgcolor=#fefefe
| 561179 ||  || — || December 16, 2012 || ESA OGS || ESA OGS ||  || align=right data-sort-value="0.93" | 930 m || 
|-id=180 bgcolor=#fefefe
| 561180 ||  || — || February 27, 2006 || Kitt Peak || Spacewatch ||  || align=right data-sort-value="0.69" | 690 m || 
|-id=181 bgcolor=#fefefe
| 561181 ||  || — || January 4, 2013 || Kitt Peak || Spacewatch ||  || align=right data-sort-value="0.64" | 640 m || 
|-id=182 bgcolor=#fefefe
| 561182 ||  || — || May 4, 2014 || Haleakala || Pan-STARRS ||  || align=right data-sort-value="0.55" | 550 m || 
|-id=183 bgcolor=#fefefe
| 561183 ||  || — || September 10, 2015 || Haleakala || Pan-STARRS ||  || align=right data-sort-value="0.44" | 440 m || 
|-id=184 bgcolor=#fefefe
| 561184 ||  || — || September 7, 2000 || Kitt Peak || Spacewatch ||  || align=right data-sort-value="0.72" | 720 m || 
|-id=185 bgcolor=#fefefe
| 561185 ||  || — || January 13, 2013 || ESA OGS || ESA OGS ||  || align=right data-sort-value="0.80" | 800 m || 
|-id=186 bgcolor=#fefefe
| 561186 ||  || — || January 10, 2013 || Haleakala || Pan-STARRS ||  || align=right data-sort-value="0.54" | 540 m || 
|-id=187 bgcolor=#fefefe
| 561187 ||  || — || September 8, 2015 || XuYi || PMO NEO ||  || align=right data-sort-value="0.83" | 830 m || 
|-id=188 bgcolor=#fefefe
| 561188 ||  || — || August 30, 2005 || Palomar || NEAT ||  || align=right data-sort-value="0.79" | 790 m || 
|-id=189 bgcolor=#fefefe
| 561189 ||  || — || July 25, 2015 || Haleakala || Pan-STARRS ||  || align=right data-sort-value="0.81" | 810 m || 
|-id=190 bgcolor=#fefefe
| 561190 ||  || — || September 6, 2015 || XuYi || PMO NEO ||  || align=right data-sort-value="0.82" | 820 m || 
|-id=191 bgcolor=#fefefe
| 561191 ||  || — || February 15, 2013 || Haleakala || Pan-STARRS ||  || align=right data-sort-value="0.98" | 980 m || 
|-id=192 bgcolor=#fefefe
| 561192 ||  || — || June 24, 2015 || Haleakala || Pan-STARRS ||  || align=right data-sort-value="0.80" | 800 m || 
|-id=193 bgcolor=#fefefe
| 561193 ||  || — || December 11, 2004 || Kitt Peak || Spacewatch ||  || align=right data-sort-value="0.71" | 710 m || 
|-id=194 bgcolor=#fefefe
| 561194 ||  || — || August 24, 2011 || Haleakala || Pan-STARRS ||  || align=right | 1.0 km || 
|-id=195 bgcolor=#fefefe
| 561195 ||  || — || October 10, 2008 || Mount Lemmon || Mount Lemmon Survey ||  || align=right data-sort-value="0.89" | 890 m || 
|-id=196 bgcolor=#fefefe
| 561196 ||  || — || October 19, 2012 || Haleakala || Pan-STARRS ||  || align=right data-sort-value="0.93" | 930 m || 
|-id=197 bgcolor=#fefefe
| 561197 ||  || — || December 9, 2012 || ASC-Kislovodsk || V. Nevski, E. S. Romas ||  || align=right | 1.00 km || 
|-id=198 bgcolor=#fefefe
| 561198 ||  || — || November 5, 2005 || Kitt Peak || Spacewatch ||  || align=right data-sort-value="0.70" | 700 m || 
|-id=199 bgcolor=#fefefe
| 561199 ||  || — || February 26, 2014 || Mount Lemmon || Mount Lemmon Survey ||  || align=right data-sort-value="0.56" | 560 m || 
|-id=200 bgcolor=#fefefe
| 561200 ||  || — || April 4, 2002 || Palomar || NEAT ||  || align=right | 1.2 km || 
|}

561201–561300 

|-bgcolor=#fefefe
| 561201 ||  || — || September 4, 2008 || Kitt Peak || Spacewatch ||  || align=right data-sort-value="0.79" | 790 m || 
|-id=202 bgcolor=#fefefe
| 561202 ||  || — || January 20, 2013 || Kitt Peak || Spacewatch ||  || align=right data-sort-value="0.69" | 690 m || 
|-id=203 bgcolor=#fefefe
| 561203 ||  || — || October 7, 2004 || Kitt Peak || Spacewatch ||  || align=right data-sort-value="0.69" | 690 m || 
|-id=204 bgcolor=#fefefe
| 561204 ||  || — || July 30, 2015 || Haleakala || Pan-STARRS ||  || align=right data-sort-value="0.74" | 740 m || 
|-id=205 bgcolor=#fefefe
| 561205 ||  || — || August 10, 2008 || Reedy Creek || J. Broughton ||  || align=right data-sort-value="0.73" | 730 m || 
|-id=206 bgcolor=#E9E9E9
| 561206 ||  || — || August 12, 2015 || Haleakala || Pan-STARRS || EUN || align=right | 1.2 km || 
|-id=207 bgcolor=#fefefe
| 561207 ||  || — || February 28, 2014 || Haleakala || Pan-STARRS ||  || align=right data-sort-value="0.89" | 890 m || 
|-id=208 bgcolor=#fefefe
| 561208 ||  || — || March 25, 2011 || Haleakala || Pan-STARRS ||  || align=right data-sort-value="0.79" | 790 m || 
|-id=209 bgcolor=#fefefe
| 561209 ||  || — || August 31, 2005 || Kitt Peak || Spacewatch ||  || align=right data-sort-value="0.79" | 790 m || 
|-id=210 bgcolor=#fefefe
| 561210 ||  || — || September 7, 2008 || Mount Lemmon || Mount Lemmon Survey ||  || align=right data-sort-value="0.73" | 730 m || 
|-id=211 bgcolor=#fefefe
| 561211 ||  || — || September 21, 1998 || Kitt Peak || Spacewatch ||  || align=right data-sort-value="0.60" | 600 m || 
|-id=212 bgcolor=#fefefe
| 561212 ||  || — || July 23, 2015 || Haleakala || Pan-STARRS ||  || align=right data-sort-value="0.72" | 720 m || 
|-id=213 bgcolor=#fefefe
| 561213 ||  || — || February 28, 2014 || Haleakala || Pan-STARRS ||  || align=right data-sort-value="0.71" | 710 m || 
|-id=214 bgcolor=#fefefe
| 561214 ||  || — || November 12, 2012 || Mount Lemmon || Mount Lemmon Survey ||  || align=right data-sort-value="0.54" | 540 m || 
|-id=215 bgcolor=#fefefe
| 561215 ||  || — || December 31, 2008 || XuYi || PMO NEO ||  || align=right data-sort-value="0.84" | 840 m || 
|-id=216 bgcolor=#fefefe
| 561216 ||  || — || September 12, 2002 || Haleakala || AMOS ||  || align=right data-sort-value="0.67" | 670 m || 
|-id=217 bgcolor=#fefefe
| 561217 ||  || — || September 6, 2008 || Catalina || CSS ||  || align=right data-sort-value="0.64" | 640 m || 
|-id=218 bgcolor=#fefefe
| 561218 ||  || — || June 13, 2005 || Mount Lemmon || Mount Lemmon Survey ||  || align=right data-sort-value="0.70" | 700 m || 
|-id=219 bgcolor=#fefefe
| 561219 ||  || — || November 3, 2005 || Mount Lemmon || Mount Lemmon Survey ||  || align=right data-sort-value="0.70" | 700 m || 
|-id=220 bgcolor=#fefefe
| 561220 ||  || — || June 28, 2004 || Siding Spring || SSS ||  || align=right | 1.2 km || 
|-id=221 bgcolor=#E9E9E9
| 561221 ||  || — || March 15, 2013 || Kitt Peak || Spacewatch || JUN || align=right | 1.1 km || 
|-id=222 bgcolor=#E9E9E9
| 561222 ||  || — || December 16, 2007 || Mount Lemmon || Mount Lemmon Survey ||  || align=right data-sort-value="0.87" | 870 m || 
|-id=223 bgcolor=#fefefe
| 561223 ||  || — || April 5, 2014 || Haleakala || Pan-STARRS ||  || align=right data-sort-value="0.51" | 510 m || 
|-id=224 bgcolor=#fefefe
| 561224 ||  || — || May 8, 2008 || Mount Lemmon || Mount Lemmon Survey ||  || align=right data-sort-value="0.45" | 450 m || 
|-id=225 bgcolor=#fefefe
| 561225 ||  || — || September 20, 2008 || Catalina || CSS ||  || align=right data-sort-value="0.91" | 910 m || 
|-id=226 bgcolor=#fefefe
| 561226 ||  || — || November 4, 2004 || Catalina || CSS ||  || align=right data-sort-value="0.80" | 800 m || 
|-id=227 bgcolor=#fefefe
| 561227 ||  || — || September 8, 2015 || Haleakala || Pan-STARRS ||  || align=right | 1.0 km || 
|-id=228 bgcolor=#fefefe
| 561228 ||  || — || January 16, 2009 || Mount Lemmon || Mount Lemmon Survey ||  || align=right data-sort-value="0.81" | 810 m || 
|-id=229 bgcolor=#fefefe
| 561229 ||  || — || July 27, 2001 || Haleakala || AMOS ||  || align=right | 1.0 km || 
|-id=230 bgcolor=#fefefe
| 561230 ||  || — || July 8, 2005 || Kitt Peak || Spacewatch ||  || align=right data-sort-value="0.58" | 580 m || 
|-id=231 bgcolor=#fefefe
| 561231 ||  || — || April 4, 2014 || Haleakala || Pan-STARRS ||  || align=right data-sort-value="0.79" | 790 m || 
|-id=232 bgcolor=#fefefe
| 561232 ||  || — || June 5, 2011 || Nogales || M. Schwartz, P. R. Holvorcem || V || align=right data-sort-value="0.83" | 830 m || 
|-id=233 bgcolor=#fefefe
| 561233 ||  || — || November 11, 2001 || Palomar || SDSS ||  || align=right data-sort-value="0.88" | 880 m || 
|-id=234 bgcolor=#fefefe
| 561234 ||  || — || February 28, 2014 || Haleakala || Pan-STARRS || V || align=right data-sort-value="0.59" | 590 m || 
|-id=235 bgcolor=#fefefe
| 561235 ||  || — || July 23, 2015 || Haleakala || Pan-STARRS ||  || align=right data-sort-value="0.89" | 890 m || 
|-id=236 bgcolor=#fefefe
| 561236 ||  || — || May 23, 2011 || Mount Lemmon || Mount Lemmon Survey || (1338) || align=right data-sort-value="0.71" | 710 m || 
|-id=237 bgcolor=#fefefe
| 561237 ||  || — || November 9, 2004 || Catalina || CSS ||  || align=right data-sort-value="0.77" | 770 m || 
|-id=238 bgcolor=#fefefe
| 561238 ||  || — || January 26, 2006 || Mount Lemmon || Mount Lemmon Survey ||  || align=right data-sort-value="0.58" | 580 m || 
|-id=239 bgcolor=#fefefe
| 561239 ||  || — || December 19, 2012 || Oukaimeden || M. Ory ||  || align=right data-sort-value="0.75" | 750 m || 
|-id=240 bgcolor=#fefefe
| 561240 ||  || — || March 26, 2003 || Kitt Peak || Spacewatch ||  || align=right data-sort-value="0.62" | 620 m || 
|-id=241 bgcolor=#E9E9E9
| 561241 ||  || — || August 29, 2006 || Kitt Peak || Spacewatch ||  || align=right | 1.5 km || 
|-id=242 bgcolor=#fefefe
| 561242 ||  || — || January 9, 2013 || Kitt Peak || Spacewatch ||  || align=right data-sort-value="0.50" | 500 m || 
|-id=243 bgcolor=#fefefe
| 561243 ||  || — || September 25, 2008 || Kitt Peak || Spacewatch ||  || align=right data-sort-value="0.61" | 610 m || 
|-id=244 bgcolor=#fefefe
| 561244 ||  || — || February 10, 2010 || Kitt Peak || Spacewatch ||  || align=right data-sort-value="0.67" | 670 m || 
|-id=245 bgcolor=#fefefe
| 561245 ||  || — || September 9, 2015 || Haleakala || Pan-STARRS ||  || align=right data-sort-value="0.65" | 650 m || 
|-id=246 bgcolor=#fefefe
| 561246 ||  || — || November 2, 2008 || Mount Lemmon || Mount Lemmon Survey ||  || align=right data-sort-value="0.64" | 640 m || 
|-id=247 bgcolor=#fefefe
| 561247 ||  || — || January 27, 2006 || Mount Lemmon || Mount Lemmon Survey ||  || align=right data-sort-value="0.62" | 620 m || 
|-id=248 bgcolor=#fefefe
| 561248 ||  || — || February 5, 2013 || Kitt Peak || Spacewatch ||  || align=right data-sort-value="0.71" | 710 m || 
|-id=249 bgcolor=#fefefe
| 561249 ||  || — || September 4, 2008 || Kitt Peak || Spacewatch ||  || align=right data-sort-value="0.77" | 770 m || 
|-id=250 bgcolor=#d6d6d6
| 561250 ||  || — || December 30, 2011 || Mount Lemmon || Mount Lemmon Survey || 7:4* || align=right | 4.1 km || 
|-id=251 bgcolor=#E9E9E9
| 561251 ||  || — || November 17, 2006 || Mount Lemmon || Mount Lemmon Survey ||  || align=right | 1.7 km || 
|-id=252 bgcolor=#fefefe
| 561252 ||  || — || October 6, 2004 || Kitt Peak || Spacewatch ||  || align=right data-sort-value="0.62" | 620 m || 
|-id=253 bgcolor=#E9E9E9
| 561253 ||  || — || November 3, 2011 || Mount Lemmon || Mount Lemmon Survey ||  || align=right | 1.1 km || 
|-id=254 bgcolor=#fefefe
| 561254 ||  || — || September 21, 2008 || Kitt Peak || Spacewatch ||  || align=right data-sort-value="0.76" | 760 m || 
|-id=255 bgcolor=#fefefe
| 561255 ||  || — || December 21, 2008 || Mount Lemmon || Mount Lemmon Survey || NYS || align=right data-sort-value="0.49" | 490 m || 
|-id=256 bgcolor=#fefefe
| 561256 ||  || — || July 28, 2011 || Haleakala || Pan-STARRS ||  || align=right data-sort-value="0.71" | 710 m || 
|-id=257 bgcolor=#E9E9E9
| 561257 ||  || — || September 24, 2011 || Haleakala || Pan-STARRS ||  || align=right data-sort-value="0.77" | 770 m || 
|-id=258 bgcolor=#fefefe
| 561258 ||  || — || September 6, 2008 || Mount Lemmon || Mount Lemmon Survey ||  || align=right data-sort-value="0.56" | 560 m || 
|-id=259 bgcolor=#fefefe
| 561259 ||  || — || January 29, 2003 || Apache Point || SDSS Collaboration ||  || align=right data-sort-value="0.69" | 690 m || 
|-id=260 bgcolor=#fefefe
| 561260 ||  || — || August 12, 2015 || Haleakala || Pan-STARRS ||  || align=right data-sort-value="0.56" | 560 m || 
|-id=261 bgcolor=#fefefe
| 561261 ||  || — || August 12, 2015 || Haleakala || Pan-STARRS ||  || align=right data-sort-value="0.67" | 670 m || 
|-id=262 bgcolor=#fefefe
| 561262 ||  || — || October 1, 2008 || Catalina || CSS ||  || align=right data-sort-value="0.56" | 560 m || 
|-id=263 bgcolor=#E9E9E9
| 561263 ||  || — || March 24, 2009 || Mount Lemmon || Mount Lemmon Survey ||  || align=right | 1.1 km || 
|-id=264 bgcolor=#d6d6d6
| 561264 ||  || — || September 10, 2015 || Bergisch Gladbach || W. Bickel ||  || align=right | 2.4 km || 
|-id=265 bgcolor=#fefefe
| 561265 ||  || — || January 10, 2013 || Haleakala || Pan-STARRS ||  || align=right data-sort-value="0.65" | 650 m || 
|-id=266 bgcolor=#fefefe
| 561266 ||  || — || January 18, 2009 || Kitt Peak || Spacewatch ||  || align=right data-sort-value="0.51" | 510 m || 
|-id=267 bgcolor=#fefefe
| 561267 ||  || — || September 11, 2015 || Haleakala || Pan-STARRS || V || align=right data-sort-value="0.54" | 540 m || 
|-id=268 bgcolor=#fefefe
| 561268 ||  || — || March 5, 2013 || Haleakala || Pan-STARRS ||  || align=right data-sort-value="0.73" | 730 m || 
|-id=269 bgcolor=#fefefe
| 561269 ||  || — || November 10, 2004 || Kitt Peak || M. W. Buie, L. H. Wasserman ||  || align=right data-sort-value="0.58" | 580 m || 
|-id=270 bgcolor=#fefefe
| 561270 ||  || — || December 1, 2008 || Mount Lemmon || Mount Lemmon Survey ||  || align=right data-sort-value="0.87" | 870 m || 
|-id=271 bgcolor=#E9E9E9
| 561271 ||  || — || November 7, 2007 || Catalina || CSS ||  || align=right data-sort-value="0.95" | 950 m || 
|-id=272 bgcolor=#fefefe
| 561272 ||  || — || September 13, 1996 || Kitt Peak || Spacewatch || V || align=right data-sort-value="0.49" | 490 m || 
|-id=273 bgcolor=#fefefe
| 561273 ||  || — || September 11, 2015 || Haleakala || Pan-STARRS ||  || align=right data-sort-value="0.58" | 580 m || 
|-id=274 bgcolor=#E9E9E9
| 561274 ||  || — || November 24, 2011 || Mount Lemmon || Mount Lemmon Survey ||  || align=right | 1.8 km || 
|-id=275 bgcolor=#E9E9E9
| 561275 ||  || — || December 26, 2011 || Kitt Peak || Spacewatch ||  || align=right | 1.7 km || 
|-id=276 bgcolor=#E9E9E9
| 561276 ||  || — || May 22, 2001 || Cerro Tololo || J. L. Elliot, L. H. Wasserman ||  || align=right | 1.5 km || 
|-id=277 bgcolor=#fefefe
| 561277 ||  || — || December 6, 2000 || Kitt Peak || Spacewatch ||  || align=right data-sort-value="0.74" | 740 m || 
|-id=278 bgcolor=#E9E9E9
| 561278 ||  || — || January 19, 2012 || Haleakala || Pan-STARRS ||  || align=right data-sort-value="0.99" | 990 m || 
|-id=279 bgcolor=#E9E9E9
| 561279 ||  || — || September 11, 2015 || Haleakala || Pan-STARRS ||  || align=right data-sort-value="0.82" | 820 m || 
|-id=280 bgcolor=#E9E9E9
| 561280 ||  || — || February 10, 2008 || Catalina || CSS ||  || align=right | 1.6 km || 
|-id=281 bgcolor=#E9E9E9
| 561281 ||  || — || December 20, 2007 || Kitt Peak || Spacewatch ||  || align=right data-sort-value="0.86" | 860 m || 
|-id=282 bgcolor=#E9E9E9
| 561282 ||  || — || November 30, 2003 || Kitt Peak || Spacewatch ||  || align=right data-sort-value="0.82" | 820 m || 
|-id=283 bgcolor=#E9E9E9
| 561283 ||  || — || August 12, 2015 || Haleakala || Pan-STARRS ||  || align=right | 1.2 km || 
|-id=284 bgcolor=#E9E9E9
| 561284 ||  || — || April 17, 2013 || Haleakala || Pan-STARRS || EUN || align=right | 1.1 km || 
|-id=285 bgcolor=#E9E9E9
| 561285 ||  || — || October 23, 2011 || Haleakala || Pan-STARRS ||  || align=right data-sort-value="0.83" | 830 m || 
|-id=286 bgcolor=#E9E9E9
| 561286 ||  || — || March 12, 2013 || Kitt Peak || Spacewatch ||  || align=right | 1.6 km || 
|-id=287 bgcolor=#fefefe
| 561287 ||  || — || December 3, 2004 || Kitt Peak || Spacewatch ||  || align=right data-sort-value="0.76" | 760 m || 
|-id=288 bgcolor=#fefefe
| 561288 ||  || — || May 28, 2014 || Mount Lemmon || Mount Lemmon Survey ||  || align=right data-sort-value="0.98" | 980 m || 
|-id=289 bgcolor=#d6d6d6
| 561289 ||  || — || September 9, 2015 || Haleakala || Pan-STARRS ||  || align=right | 1.9 km || 
|-id=290 bgcolor=#fefefe
| 561290 ||  || — || January 26, 2006 || Kitt Peak || Spacewatch ||  || align=right data-sort-value="0.73" | 730 m || 
|-id=291 bgcolor=#E9E9E9
| 561291 ||  || — || February 20, 2009 || Kitt Peak || Spacewatch ||  || align=right data-sort-value="0.78" | 780 m || 
|-id=292 bgcolor=#E9E9E9
| 561292 ||  || — || November 8, 2007 || Kitt Peak || Spacewatch ||  || align=right data-sort-value="0.65" | 650 m || 
|-id=293 bgcolor=#E9E9E9
| 561293 ||  || — || May 9, 2013 || Haleakala || Pan-STARRS ||  || align=right | 1.2 km || 
|-id=294 bgcolor=#E9E9E9
| 561294 ||  || — || January 15, 2008 || Mount Lemmon || Mount Lemmon Survey ||  || align=right data-sort-value="0.93" | 930 m || 
|-id=295 bgcolor=#E9E9E9
| 561295 ||  || — || April 10, 2013 || Haleakala || Pan-STARRS ||  || align=right data-sort-value="0.83" | 830 m || 
|-id=296 bgcolor=#E9E9E9
| 561296 ||  || — || December 14, 2007 || Mount Lemmon || Mount Lemmon Survey ||  || align=right | 1.2 km || 
|-id=297 bgcolor=#fefefe
| 561297 ||  || — || August 23, 2011 || Haleakala || Pan-STARRS ||  || align=right data-sort-value="0.75" | 750 m || 
|-id=298 bgcolor=#fefefe
| 561298 ||  || — || February 19, 2007 || Mount Lemmon || Mount Lemmon Survey ||  || align=right data-sort-value="0.68" | 680 m || 
|-id=299 bgcolor=#fefefe
| 561299 ||  || — || December 23, 2012 || Haleakala || Pan-STARRS ||  || align=right data-sort-value="0.73" | 730 m || 
|-id=300 bgcolor=#fefefe
| 561300 ||  || — || March 5, 2002 || Kitt Peak || SDSS ||  || align=right data-sort-value="0.81" | 810 m || 
|}

561301–561400 

|-bgcolor=#E9E9E9
| 561301 ||  || — || December 2, 2011 || ESA OGS || ESA OGS ||  || align=right data-sort-value="0.82" | 820 m || 
|-id=302 bgcolor=#fefefe
| 561302 ||  || — || September 11, 2015 || Haleakala || Pan-STARRS ||  || align=right data-sort-value="0.54" | 540 m || 
|-id=303 bgcolor=#fefefe
| 561303 ||  || — || February 17, 2010 || Kitt Peak || Spacewatch ||  || align=right data-sort-value="0.55" | 550 m || 
|-id=304 bgcolor=#d6d6d6
| 561304 ||  || — || November 13, 2010 || Mount Lemmon || Mount Lemmon Survey ||  || align=right | 2.5 km || 
|-id=305 bgcolor=#E9E9E9
| 561305 ||  || — || September 9, 2015 || Haleakala || Pan-STARRS ||  || align=right | 1.3 km || 
|-id=306 bgcolor=#E9E9E9
| 561306 ||  || — || October 22, 2006 || Kitt Peak || Spacewatch ||  || align=right | 1.6 km || 
|-id=307 bgcolor=#E9E9E9
| 561307 ||  || — || August 29, 2006 || Kitt Peak || Spacewatch ||  || align=right data-sort-value="0.91" | 910 m || 
|-id=308 bgcolor=#E9E9E9
| 561308 ||  || — || October 23, 2011 || Kitt Peak || Spacewatch ||  || align=right data-sort-value="0.81" | 810 m || 
|-id=309 bgcolor=#E9E9E9
| 561309 ||  || — || April 19, 2004 || Kitt Peak || Spacewatch ||  || align=right | 1.5 km || 
|-id=310 bgcolor=#E9E9E9
| 561310 ||  || — || October 26, 2011 || Haleakala || Pan-STARRS ||  || align=right data-sort-value="0.69" | 690 m || 
|-id=311 bgcolor=#d6d6d6
| 561311 ||  || — || September 18, 2010 || Kitt Peak || Spacewatch ||  || align=right | 1.7 km || 
|-id=312 bgcolor=#fefefe
| 561312 ||  || — || August 27, 2011 || Haleakala || Pan-STARRS ||  || align=right data-sort-value="0.66" | 660 m || 
|-id=313 bgcolor=#E9E9E9
| 561313 ||  || — || October 23, 2011 || Haleakala || Pan-STARRS ||  || align=right data-sort-value="0.94" | 940 m || 
|-id=314 bgcolor=#E9E9E9
| 561314 ||  || — || September 27, 2019 || Haleakala || Pan-STARRS ||  || align=right data-sort-value="0.82" | 820 m || 
|-id=315 bgcolor=#fefefe
| 561315 ||  || — || September 11, 2015 || Haleakala || Pan-STARRS ||  || align=right data-sort-value="0.70" | 700 m || 
|-id=316 bgcolor=#E9E9E9
| 561316 ||  || — || September 9, 2015 || Haleakala || Pan-STARRS ||  || align=right | 1.8 km || 
|-id=317 bgcolor=#d6d6d6
| 561317 ||  || — || September 9, 2015 || Haleakala || Pan-STARRS ||  || align=right | 2.8 km || 
|-id=318 bgcolor=#d6d6d6
| 561318 ||  || — || September 8, 2015 || Haleakala || Pan-STARRS ||  || align=right | 2.1 km || 
|-id=319 bgcolor=#d6d6d6
| 561319 ||  || — || September 12, 2015 || Haleakala || Pan-STARRS ||  || align=right | 2.1 km || 
|-id=320 bgcolor=#E9E9E9
| 561320 ||  || — || September 12, 2015 || Haleakala || Pan-STARRS ||  || align=right | 1.6 km || 
|-id=321 bgcolor=#fefefe
| 561321 ||  || — || October 29, 2008 || Mount Lemmon || Mount Lemmon Survey ||  || align=right data-sort-value="0.85" | 850 m || 
|-id=322 bgcolor=#FA8072
| 561322 ||  || — || September 24, 2006 || Anderson Mesa || LONEOS ||  || align=right | 2.3 km || 
|-id=323 bgcolor=#fefefe
| 561323 ||  || — || January 20, 2009 || Mount Lemmon || Mount Lemmon Survey ||  || align=right data-sort-value="0.92" | 920 m || 
|-id=324 bgcolor=#fefefe
| 561324 ||  || — || January 20, 2009 || Mount Lemmon || Mount Lemmon Survey ||  || align=right data-sort-value="0.86" | 860 m || 
|-id=325 bgcolor=#fefefe
| 561325 ||  || — || December 21, 2012 || Mount Lemmon || Mount Lemmon Survey ||  || align=right data-sort-value="0.86" | 860 m || 
|-id=326 bgcolor=#fefefe
| 561326 ||  || — || June 5, 2014 || Haleakala || Pan-STARRS ||  || align=right | 1.0 km || 
|-id=327 bgcolor=#fefefe
| 561327 ||  || — || September 22, 2008 || Mount Lemmon || Mount Lemmon Survey ||  || align=right data-sort-value="0.64" | 640 m || 
|-id=328 bgcolor=#fefefe
| 561328 ||  || — || November 9, 2004 || Catalina || CSS ||  || align=right data-sort-value="0.69" | 690 m || 
|-id=329 bgcolor=#fefefe
| 561329 ||  || — || August 23, 2004 || Kitt Peak || Spacewatch ||  || align=right data-sort-value="0.59" | 590 m || 
|-id=330 bgcolor=#fefefe
| 561330 ||  || — || October 1, 2008 || Mount Lemmon || Mount Lemmon Survey ||  || align=right data-sort-value="0.81" | 810 m || 
|-id=331 bgcolor=#fefefe
| 561331 ||  || — || August 3, 2008 || Wise || D. Polishook ||  || align=right data-sort-value="0.69" | 690 m || 
|-id=332 bgcolor=#fefefe
| 561332 ||  || — || December 5, 2005 || Mount Lemmon || Mount Lemmon Survey ||  || align=right data-sort-value="0.89" | 890 m || 
|-id=333 bgcolor=#fefefe
| 561333 ||  || — || September 18, 2015 || Kitt Peak || Spacewatch ||  || align=right data-sort-value="0.76" | 760 m || 
|-id=334 bgcolor=#fefefe
| 561334 ||  || — || December 1, 2005 || Kitt Peak || Mount Lemmon Survey ||  || align=right data-sort-value="0.77" | 770 m || 
|-id=335 bgcolor=#fefefe
| 561335 ||  || — || November 4, 2005 || Mount Lemmon || Mount Lemmon Survey ||  || align=right data-sort-value="0.84" | 840 m || 
|-id=336 bgcolor=#fefefe
| 561336 ||  || — || April 29, 2014 || Haleakala || Pan-STARRS ||  || align=right data-sort-value="0.73" | 730 m || 
|-id=337 bgcolor=#fefefe
| 561337 ||  || — || January 27, 2007 || Mount Lemmon || Mount Lemmon Survey ||  || align=right data-sort-value="0.74" | 740 m || 
|-id=338 bgcolor=#E9E9E9
| 561338 ||  || — || July 19, 2006 || Mauna Kea || Mauna Kea Obs. ||  || align=right data-sort-value="0.89" | 890 m || 
|-id=339 bgcolor=#E9E9E9
| 561339 ||  || — || October 27, 2011 || Mount Lemmon || Mount Lemmon Survey ||  || align=right data-sort-value="0.98" | 980 m || 
|-id=340 bgcolor=#E9E9E9
| 561340 ||  || — || September 19, 2015 || Haleakala || Pan-STARRS ||  || align=right | 1.7 km || 
|-id=341 bgcolor=#fefefe
| 561341 ||  || — || November 4, 2004 || Kitt Peak || Spacewatch ||  || align=right data-sort-value="0.87" | 870 m || 
|-id=342 bgcolor=#E9E9E9
| 561342 ||  || — || September 23, 2015 || Haleakala || Pan-STARRS ||  || align=right | 1.0 km || 
|-id=343 bgcolor=#fefefe
| 561343 ||  || — || February 4, 2005 || Kitt Peak || Spacewatch ||  || align=right data-sort-value="0.79" | 790 m || 
|-id=344 bgcolor=#fefefe
| 561344 ||  || — || March 19, 2010 || Mount Lemmon || Mount Lemmon Survey ||  || align=right data-sort-value="0.89" | 890 m || 
|-id=345 bgcolor=#E9E9E9
| 561345 ||  || — || September 19, 2015 || Haleakala || Pan-STARRS ||  || align=right data-sort-value="0.89" | 890 m || 
|-id=346 bgcolor=#E9E9E9
| 561346 ||  || — || September 19, 2015 || Haleakala || Pan-STARRS ||  || align=right | 1.2 km || 
|-id=347 bgcolor=#fefefe
| 561347 ||  || — || September 20, 2015 || Mount Lemmon || Mount Lemmon Survey ||  || align=right data-sort-value="0.67" | 670 m || 
|-id=348 bgcolor=#E9E9E9
| 561348 ||  || — || November 11, 2007 || Mount Lemmon || Mount Lemmon Survey ||  || align=right data-sort-value="0.97" | 970 m || 
|-id=349 bgcolor=#E9E9E9
| 561349 ||  || — || November 25, 2011 || Haleakala || Pan-STARRS ||  || align=right data-sort-value="0.96" | 960 m || 
|-id=350 bgcolor=#E9E9E9
| 561350 ||  || — || February 13, 2008 || Catalina || CSS ||  || align=right | 1.5 km || 
|-id=351 bgcolor=#fefefe
| 561351 ||  || — || April 9, 2010 || Kitt Peak || Spacewatch ||  || align=right data-sort-value="0.92" | 920 m || 
|-id=352 bgcolor=#fefefe
| 561352 ||  || — || August 24, 2001 || Haleakala || AMOS ||  || align=right | 1.0 km || 
|-id=353 bgcolor=#FA8072
| 561353 ||  || — || March 10, 2008 || Kitt Peak || Spacewatch ||  || align=right | 1.2 km || 
|-id=354 bgcolor=#fefefe
| 561354 ||  || — || November 30, 2005 || Mount Lemmon || Mount Lemmon Survey ||  || align=right data-sort-value="0.70" | 700 m || 
|-id=355 bgcolor=#fefefe
| 561355 ||  || — || July 16, 2004 || Cerro Tololo || Cerro Tololo Obs. ||  || align=right data-sort-value="0.69" | 690 m || 
|-id=356 bgcolor=#fefefe
| 561356 ||  || — || October 2, 2015 || Mount Lemmon || Mount Lemmon Survey ||  || align=right data-sort-value="0.55" | 550 m || 
|-id=357 bgcolor=#fefefe
| 561357 ||  || — || April 2, 2014 || Mount Lemmon || Mount Lemmon Survey ||  || align=right data-sort-value="0.83" | 830 m || 
|-id=358 bgcolor=#d6d6d6
| 561358 ||  || — || December 2, 2010 || Mount Lemmon || Mount Lemmon Survey ||  || align=right | 2.5 km || 
|-id=359 bgcolor=#fefefe
| 561359 ||  || — || March 14, 2011 || Mount Lemmon || Mount Lemmon Survey ||  || align=right data-sort-value="0.68" | 680 m || 
|-id=360 bgcolor=#fefefe
| 561360 ||  || — || November 22, 2008 || Kitt Peak || Spacewatch ||  || align=right data-sort-value="0.89" | 890 m || 
|-id=361 bgcolor=#fefefe
| 561361 ||  || — || November 6, 2008 || Mount Lemmon || Mount Lemmon Survey ||  || align=right data-sort-value="0.69" | 690 m || 
|-id=362 bgcolor=#d6d6d6
| 561362 ||  || — || November 1, 2005 || Mount Lemmon || Mount Lemmon Survey ||  || align=right | 2.3 km || 
|-id=363 bgcolor=#fefefe
| 561363 ||  || — || June 13, 2005 || Mount Lemmon || Mount Lemmon Survey ||  || align=right data-sort-value="0.59" | 590 m || 
|-id=364 bgcolor=#fefefe
| 561364 ||  || — || October 14, 2012 || Kitt Peak || Spacewatch ||  || align=right data-sort-value="0.71" | 710 m || 
|-id=365 bgcolor=#fefefe
| 561365 ||  || — || November 23, 2012 || Kitt Peak || Spacewatch ||  || align=right data-sort-value="0.78" | 780 m || 
|-id=366 bgcolor=#fefefe
| 561366 ||  || — || January 7, 2010 || Mount Lemmon || Mount Lemmon Survey ||  || align=right data-sort-value="0.82" | 820 m || 
|-id=367 bgcolor=#fefefe
| 561367 ||  || — || July 4, 2005 || Palomar || NEAT ||  || align=right data-sort-value="0.81" | 810 m || 
|-id=368 bgcolor=#d6d6d6
| 561368 ||  || — || June 5, 2014 || Haleakala || Pan-STARRS ||  || align=right | 2.9 km || 
|-id=369 bgcolor=#E9E9E9
| 561369 ||  || — || January 12, 2008 || Catalina || CSS ||  || align=right | 1.9 km || 
|-id=370 bgcolor=#E9E9E9
| 561370 ||  || — || December 31, 2007 || Mount Lemmon || Mount Lemmon Survey ||  || align=right | 1.3 km || 
|-id=371 bgcolor=#fefefe
| 561371 ||  || — || January 10, 2013 || Haleakala || Pan-STARRS ||  || align=right data-sort-value="0.70" | 700 m || 
|-id=372 bgcolor=#FA8072
| 561372 ||  || — || May 24, 2015 || Haleakala || Pan-STARRS ||  || align=right | 1.4 km || 
|-id=373 bgcolor=#E9E9E9
| 561373 ||  || — || January 8, 2007 || Catalina || CSS ||  || align=right | 2.1 km || 
|-id=374 bgcolor=#fefefe
| 561374 ||  || — || April 1, 2011 || Kitt Peak || Mount Lemmon Survey ||  || align=right data-sort-value="0.64" | 640 m || 
|-id=375 bgcolor=#E9E9E9
| 561375 ||  || — || December 17, 2007 || Catalina || CSS ||  || align=right | 1.3 km || 
|-id=376 bgcolor=#fefefe
| 561376 ||  || — || March 2, 2009 || Mount Lemmon || Mount Lemmon Survey ||  || align=right | 1.2 km || 
|-id=377 bgcolor=#E9E9E9
| 561377 ||  || — || October 16, 2002 || Palomar || NEAT ||  || align=right | 1.5 km || 
|-id=378 bgcolor=#fefefe
| 561378 ||  || — || October 7, 2004 || Kitt Peak || Spacewatch ||  || align=right data-sort-value="0.62" | 620 m || 
|-id=379 bgcolor=#fefefe
| 561379 ||  || — || March 19, 2004 || Socorro || LINEAR ||  || align=right data-sort-value="0.74" | 740 m || 
|-id=380 bgcolor=#E9E9E9
| 561380 ||  || — || May 24, 2014 || Haleakala || Pan-STARRS ||  || align=right | 2.0 km || 
|-id=381 bgcolor=#fefefe
| 561381 ||  || — || November 13, 2012 || Mount Lemmon || Mount Lemmon Survey ||  || align=right data-sort-value="0.61" | 610 m || 
|-id=382 bgcolor=#d6d6d6
| 561382 ||  || — || December 27, 2011 || Kitt Peak || Spacewatch ||  || align=right | 2.5 km || 
|-id=383 bgcolor=#d6d6d6
| 561383 ||  || — || December 1, 2005 || Kitt Peak || Spacewatch ||  || align=right | 3.0 km || 
|-id=384 bgcolor=#fefefe
| 561384 ||  || — || November 30, 2008 || Kitt Peak || Spacewatch ||  || align=right data-sort-value="0.74" | 740 m || 
|-id=385 bgcolor=#fefefe
| 561385 ||  || — || January 17, 1994 || Kitt Peak || Spacewatch ||  || align=right data-sort-value="0.79" | 790 m || 
|-id=386 bgcolor=#fefefe
| 561386 ||  || — || October 30, 2008 || Mount Lemmon || Mount Lemmon Survey ||  || align=right data-sort-value="0.84" | 840 m || 
|-id=387 bgcolor=#fefefe
| 561387 ||  || — || September 23, 2008 || Kitt Peak || Spacewatch ||  || align=right data-sort-value="0.80" | 800 m || 
|-id=388 bgcolor=#fefefe
| 561388 ||  || — || October 27, 2005 || Mount Lemmon || Mount Lemmon Survey ||  || align=right data-sort-value="0.85" | 850 m || 
|-id=389 bgcolor=#d6d6d6
| 561389 ||  || — || March 4, 2013 || Haleakala || Pan-STARRS ||  || align=right | 2.7 km || 
|-id=390 bgcolor=#E9E9E9
| 561390 ||  || — || May 21, 2014 || Haleakala || Pan-STARRS ||  || align=right | 1.6 km || 
|-id=391 bgcolor=#fefefe
| 561391 ||  || — || February 22, 2003 || Palomar || NEAT ||  || align=right data-sort-value="0.89" | 890 m || 
|-id=392 bgcolor=#fefefe
| 561392 ||  || — || October 15, 2004 || Mount Lemmon || Mount Lemmon Survey ||  || align=right data-sort-value="0.62" | 620 m || 
|-id=393 bgcolor=#fefefe
| 561393 ||  || — || February 9, 2013 || Haleakala || Pan-STARRS ||  || align=right data-sort-value="0.84" | 840 m || 
|-id=394 bgcolor=#fefefe
| 561394 ||  || — || January 22, 2013 || Mount Lemmon || Mount Lemmon Survey ||  || align=right data-sort-value="0.70" | 700 m || 
|-id=395 bgcolor=#fefefe
| 561395 ||  || — || October 9, 2007 || Mount Lemmon || Mount Lemmon Survey ||  || align=right data-sort-value="0.76" | 760 m || 
|-id=396 bgcolor=#E9E9E9
| 561396 ||  || — || February 3, 2012 || Mount Lemmon || Mount Lemmon Survey ||  || align=right | 1.2 km || 
|-id=397 bgcolor=#E9E9E9
| 561397 ||  || — || September 27, 2011 || Mount Lemmon || Mount Lemmon Survey ||  || align=right data-sort-value="0.79" | 790 m || 
|-id=398 bgcolor=#fefefe
| 561398 ||  || — || March 26, 2007 || Kitt Peak || Spacewatch ||  || align=right data-sort-value="0.76" | 760 m || 
|-id=399 bgcolor=#fefefe
| 561399 ||  || — || May 10, 2014 || Haleakala || Pan-STARRS ||  || align=right data-sort-value="0.81" | 810 m || 
|-id=400 bgcolor=#E9E9E9
| 561400 ||  || — || October 25, 2011 || Haleakala || Pan-STARRS ||  || align=right data-sort-value="0.80" | 800 m || 
|}

561401–561500 

|-bgcolor=#E9E9E9
| 561401 ||  || — || October 15, 1998 || Kitt Peak || Spacewatch ||  || align=right data-sort-value="0.85" | 850 m || 
|-id=402 bgcolor=#E9E9E9
| 561402 ||  || — || October 8, 2015 || Haleakala || Pan-STARRS ||  || align=right | 1.4 km || 
|-id=403 bgcolor=#fefefe
| 561403 ||  || — || March 18, 2010 || Mount Lemmon || Mount Lemmon Survey ||  || align=right data-sort-value="0.62" | 620 m || 
|-id=404 bgcolor=#E9E9E9
| 561404 ||  || — || January 25, 2012 || Haleakala || Pan-STARRS ||  || align=right | 2.2 km || 
|-id=405 bgcolor=#fefefe
| 561405 ||  || — || March 24, 2006 || Mount Lemmon || Mount Lemmon Survey ||  || align=right data-sort-value="0.91" | 910 m || 
|-id=406 bgcolor=#E9E9E9
| 561406 ||  || — || October 24, 2011 || Kitt Peak || Spacewatch ||  || align=right data-sort-value="0.85" | 850 m || 
|-id=407 bgcolor=#FA8072
| 561407 ||  || — || October 2, 2008 || Kitt Peak || Spacewatch ||  || align=right data-sort-value="0.63" | 630 m || 
|-id=408 bgcolor=#E9E9E9
| 561408 ||  || — || March 31, 2009 || Kitt Peak || Spacewatch ||  || align=right | 1.8 km || 
|-id=409 bgcolor=#fefefe
| 561409 ||  || — || September 21, 2011 || Haleakala || Pan-STARRS ||  || align=right data-sort-value="0.66" | 660 m || 
|-id=410 bgcolor=#fefefe
| 561410 ||  || — || April 19, 2007 || Mount Lemmon || Mount Lemmon Survey ||  || align=right data-sort-value="0.83" | 830 m || 
|-id=411 bgcolor=#fefefe
| 561411 ||  || — || October 8, 2015 || Haleakala || Pan-STARRS ||  || align=right data-sort-value="0.80" | 800 m || 
|-id=412 bgcolor=#E9E9E9
| 561412 ||  || — || November 5, 2007 || Mount Lemmon || Mount Lemmon Survey ||  || align=right data-sort-value="0.70" | 700 m || 
|-id=413 bgcolor=#fefefe
| 561413 ||  || — || November 5, 2004 || Palomar || NEAT ||  || align=right data-sort-value="0.86" | 860 m || 
|-id=414 bgcolor=#fefefe
| 561414 ||  || — || February 28, 2014 || Haleakala || Pan-STARRS ||  || align=right data-sort-value="0.60" | 600 m || 
|-id=415 bgcolor=#fefefe
| 561415 ||  || — || January 10, 2013 || Haleakala || Pan-STARRS ||  || align=right data-sort-value="0.72" | 720 m || 
|-id=416 bgcolor=#fefefe
| 561416 ||  || — || March 19, 2010 || Mount Lemmon || Mount Lemmon Survey ||  || align=right data-sort-value="0.74" | 740 m || 
|-id=417 bgcolor=#E9E9E9
| 561417 ||  || — || October 25, 2011 || Haleakala || Pan-STARRS ||  || align=right data-sort-value="0.85" | 850 m || 
|-id=418 bgcolor=#E9E9E9
| 561418 ||  || — || July 25, 2014 || Haleakala || Pan-STARRS ||  || align=right data-sort-value="0.98" | 980 m || 
|-id=419 bgcolor=#E9E9E9
| 561419 ||  || — || October 8, 2015 || Haleakala || Pan-STARRS ||  || align=right | 1.4 km || 
|-id=420 bgcolor=#E9E9E9
| 561420 ||  || — || December 1, 2011 || Haleakala || Pan-STARRS ||  || align=right data-sort-value="0.96" | 960 m || 
|-id=421 bgcolor=#fefefe
| 561421 ||  || — || May 6, 2010 || Mount Lemmon || Mount Lemmon Survey ||  || align=right data-sort-value="0.94" | 940 m || 
|-id=422 bgcolor=#fefefe
| 561422 ||  || — || October 3, 1996 || Peking || Xinglong Stn. ||  || align=right data-sort-value="0.79" | 790 m || 
|-id=423 bgcolor=#E9E9E9
| 561423 ||  || — || May 11, 2005 || Mount Lemmon || Mount Lemmon Survey ||  || align=right | 1.2 km || 
|-id=424 bgcolor=#E9E9E9
| 561424 ||  || — || December 31, 2011 || Mayhill-ISON || L. Elenin ||  || align=right | 1.3 km || 
|-id=425 bgcolor=#E9E9E9
| 561425 ||  || — || January 15, 2008 || Mount Lemmon || Mount Lemmon Survey ||  || align=right | 1.1 km || 
|-id=426 bgcolor=#fefefe
| 561426 ||  || — || October 8, 2015 || Haleakala || Pan-STARRS ||  || align=right data-sort-value="0.61" | 610 m || 
|-id=427 bgcolor=#E9E9E9
| 561427 ||  || — || March 8, 2005 || Mount Lemmon || Mount Lemmon Survey ||  || align=right | 1.0 km || 
|-id=428 bgcolor=#E9E9E9
| 561428 ||  || — || October 8, 2015 || Haleakala || Pan-STARRS ||  || align=right | 1.2 km || 
|-id=429 bgcolor=#E9E9E9
| 561429 ||  || — || October 23, 2011 || Haleakala || Pan-STARRS ||  || align=right data-sort-value="0.77" | 770 m || 
|-id=430 bgcolor=#E9E9E9
| 561430 ||  || — || October 8, 2015 || Haleakala || Pan-STARRS ||  || align=right | 1.5 km || 
|-id=431 bgcolor=#E9E9E9
| 561431 ||  || — || April 9, 2013 || Haleakala || Pan-STARRS ||  || align=right data-sort-value="0.89" | 890 m || 
|-id=432 bgcolor=#E9E9E9
| 561432 ||  || — || September 28, 1998 || Kitt Peak || Spacewatch ||  || align=right data-sort-value="0.93" | 930 m || 
|-id=433 bgcolor=#E9E9E9
| 561433 ||  || — || September 19, 1998 || Apache Point || SDSS Collaboration ||  || align=right data-sort-value="0.75" | 750 m || 
|-id=434 bgcolor=#fefefe
| 561434 ||  || — || May 7, 2014 || Haleakala || Pan-STARRS ||  || align=right data-sort-value="0.85" | 850 m || 
|-id=435 bgcolor=#fefefe
| 561435 ||  || — || September 25, 2011 || Haleakala || Pan-STARRS ||  || align=right data-sort-value="0.81" | 810 m || 
|-id=436 bgcolor=#E9E9E9
| 561436 ||  || — || November 16, 2011 || Kitt Peak || Spacewatch ||  || align=right data-sort-value="0.77" | 770 m || 
|-id=437 bgcolor=#E9E9E9
| 561437 ||  || — || March 12, 2005 || Kitt Peak || M. W. Buie, L. H. Wasserman ||  || align=right data-sort-value="0.92" | 920 m || 
|-id=438 bgcolor=#E9E9E9
| 561438 ||  || — || November 17, 2007 || Kitt Peak || Spacewatch ||  || align=right data-sort-value="0.87" | 870 m || 
|-id=439 bgcolor=#E9E9E9
| 561439 ||  || — || June 24, 2014 || Haleakala || Pan-STARRS ||  || align=right | 1.5 km || 
|-id=440 bgcolor=#E9E9E9
| 561440 ||  || — || September 25, 2006 || Kitt Peak || Spacewatch || JUN || align=right data-sort-value="0.65" | 650 m || 
|-id=441 bgcolor=#E9E9E9
| 561441 ||  || — || October 8, 2015 || Haleakala || Pan-STARRS ||  || align=right | 1.2 km || 
|-id=442 bgcolor=#fefefe
| 561442 ||  || — || September 18, 2011 || Catalina || CSS ||  || align=right data-sort-value="0.84" | 840 m || 
|-id=443 bgcolor=#E9E9E9
| 561443 ||  || — || November 19, 2006 || Catalina || CSS ||  || align=right | 1.8 km || 
|-id=444 bgcolor=#E9E9E9
| 561444 ||  || — || October 8, 2015 || Haleakala || Pan-STARRS ||  || align=right data-sort-value="0.80" | 800 m || 
|-id=445 bgcolor=#E9E9E9
| 561445 ||  || — || October 8, 2015 || Haleakala || Pan-STARRS ||  || align=right data-sort-value="0.85" | 850 m || 
|-id=446 bgcolor=#fefefe
| 561446 ||  || — || May 6, 2014 || Haleakala || Pan-STARRS ||  || align=right data-sort-value="0.82" | 820 m || 
|-id=447 bgcolor=#E9E9E9
| 561447 ||  || — || June 30, 2014 || Haleakala || Pan-STARRS ||  || align=right | 1.0 km || 
|-id=448 bgcolor=#E9E9E9
| 561448 ||  || — || February 27, 2008 || Mount Lemmon || Mount Lemmon Survey ||  || align=right data-sort-value="0.98" | 980 m || 
|-id=449 bgcolor=#E9E9E9
| 561449 ||  || — || October 8, 2015 || Haleakala || Pan-STARRS ||  || align=right data-sort-value="0.99" | 990 m || 
|-id=450 bgcolor=#E9E9E9
| 561450 ||  || — || December 29, 2003 || Kitt Peak || Spacewatch ||  || align=right | 1.3 km || 
|-id=451 bgcolor=#E9E9E9
| 561451 ||  || — || September 19, 2015 || Haleakala || Pan-STARRS ||  || align=right | 1.6 km || 
|-id=452 bgcolor=#E9E9E9
| 561452 ||  || — || May 12, 2013 || Haleakala || Pan-STARRS ||  || align=right | 1.4 km || 
|-id=453 bgcolor=#E9E9E9
| 561453 ||  || — || June 16, 2014 || Mount Lemmon || Mount Lemmon Survey ||  || align=right | 1.1 km || 
|-id=454 bgcolor=#E9E9E9
| 561454 ||  || — || February 21, 2012 || Mount Lemmon || Mount Lemmon Survey ||  || align=right | 1.5 km || 
|-id=455 bgcolor=#E9E9E9
| 561455 ||  || — || March 30, 2008 || Kitt Peak || Spacewatch ||  || align=right | 2.4 km || 
|-id=456 bgcolor=#E9E9E9
| 561456 ||  || — || October 8, 2015 || Haleakala || Pan-STARRS ||  || align=right data-sort-value="0.80" | 800 m || 
|-id=457 bgcolor=#fefefe
| 561457 ||  || — || September 11, 2015 || Haleakala || Pan-STARRS ||  || align=right data-sort-value="0.58" | 580 m || 
|-id=458 bgcolor=#fefefe
| 561458 ||  || — || February 28, 2014 || Haleakala || Pan-STARRS ||  || align=right data-sort-value="0.62" | 620 m || 
|-id=459 bgcolor=#fefefe
| 561459 ||  || — || August 8, 2004 || Palomar || NEAT ||  || align=right data-sort-value="0.86" | 860 m || 
|-id=460 bgcolor=#E9E9E9
| 561460 ||  || — || October 26, 2011 || Haleakala || Pan-STARRS ||  || align=right | 1.0 km || 
|-id=461 bgcolor=#E9E9E9
| 561461 ||  || — || August 21, 2015 || Haleakala || Pan-STARRS ||  || align=right | 1.6 km || 
|-id=462 bgcolor=#E9E9E9
| 561462 ||  || — || November 16, 2011 || Kitt Peak || Spacewatch ||  || align=right | 1.7 km || 
|-id=463 bgcolor=#E9E9E9
| 561463 ||  || — || January 22, 2004 || Socorro || LINEAR || RAF || align=right data-sort-value="0.58" | 580 m || 
|-id=464 bgcolor=#E9E9E9
| 561464 ||  || — || April 18, 2009 || Kitt Peak || Spacewatch ||  || align=right data-sort-value="0.77" | 770 m || 
|-id=465 bgcolor=#fefefe
| 561465 ||  || — || October 8, 2015 || Haleakala || Pan-STARRS ||  || align=right data-sort-value="0.66" | 660 m || 
|-id=466 bgcolor=#fefefe
| 561466 ||  || — || July 26, 2011 || Haleakala || Pan-STARRS ||  || align=right data-sort-value="0.51" | 510 m || 
|-id=467 bgcolor=#fefefe
| 561467 ||  || — || July 27, 2011 || Haleakala || Pan-STARRS ||  || align=right data-sort-value="0.68" | 680 m || 
|-id=468 bgcolor=#fefefe
| 561468 ||  || — || February 14, 2010 || Mount Lemmon || Mount Lemmon Survey ||  || align=right data-sort-value="0.76" | 760 m || 
|-id=469 bgcolor=#fefefe
| 561469 ||  || — || September 18, 2011 || Mount Lemmon || Mount Lemmon Survey ||  || align=right data-sort-value="0.77" | 770 m || 
|-id=470 bgcolor=#E9E9E9
| 561470 ||  || — || September 12, 2015 || Haleakala || Pan-STARRS ||  || align=right | 2.0 km || 
|-id=471 bgcolor=#E9E9E9
| 561471 ||  || — || October 8, 2015 || Haleakala || Pan-STARRS ||  || align=right data-sort-value="0.91" | 910 m || 
|-id=472 bgcolor=#fefefe
| 561472 ||  || — || January 16, 2013 || Haleakala || Pan-STARRS ||  || align=right data-sort-value="0.99" | 990 m || 
|-id=473 bgcolor=#fefefe
| 561473 ||  || — || August 27, 2011 || Haleakala || Pan-STARRS ||  || align=right data-sort-value="0.73" | 730 m || 
|-id=474 bgcolor=#fefefe
| 561474 ||  || — || September 18, 2004 || Socorro || LINEAR ||  || align=right data-sort-value="0.81" | 810 m || 
|-id=475 bgcolor=#E9E9E9
| 561475 ||  || — || March 2, 2009 || Mount Lemmon || Mount Lemmon Survey ||  || align=right | 1.2 km || 
|-id=476 bgcolor=#fefefe
| 561476 ||  || — || September 11, 2007 || Mount Lemmon || Mount Lemmon Survey ||  || align=right data-sort-value="0.66" | 660 m || 
|-id=477 bgcolor=#fefefe
| 561477 ||  || — || January 5, 2006 || Kitt Peak || Spacewatch ||  || align=right data-sort-value="0.54" | 540 m || 
|-id=478 bgcolor=#fefefe
| 561478 ||  || — || January 17, 2013 || Haleakala || Pan-STARRS ||  || align=right data-sort-value="0.51" | 510 m || 
|-id=479 bgcolor=#fefefe
| 561479 ||  || — || March 28, 2011 || Kitt Peak || Spacewatch ||  || align=right data-sort-value="0.56" | 560 m || 
|-id=480 bgcolor=#fefefe
| 561480 ||  || — || September 20, 2011 || Haleakala || Pan-STARRS ||  || align=right data-sort-value="0.68" | 680 m || 
|-id=481 bgcolor=#fefefe
| 561481 ||  || — || February 3, 2013 || Haleakala || Pan-STARRS || NYS || align=right data-sort-value="0.49" | 490 m || 
|-id=482 bgcolor=#fefefe
| 561482 ||  || — || August 25, 2004 || Kitt Peak || Spacewatch ||  || align=right data-sort-value="0.67" | 670 m || 
|-id=483 bgcolor=#fefefe
| 561483 ||  || — || April 12, 2004 || Palomar || NEAT ||  || align=right data-sort-value="0.85" | 850 m || 
|-id=484 bgcolor=#fefefe
| 561484 ||  || — || March 12, 2002 || Kitt Peak || Spacewatch ||  || align=right data-sort-value="0.67" | 670 m || 
|-id=485 bgcolor=#fefefe
| 561485 ||  || — || December 21, 2008 || Kitt Peak || Spacewatch ||  || align=right data-sort-value="0.59" | 590 m || 
|-id=486 bgcolor=#fefefe
| 561486 ||  || — || October 1, 2008 || Kitt Peak || Spacewatch ||  || align=right data-sort-value="0.78" | 780 m || 
|-id=487 bgcolor=#fefefe
| 561487 ||  || — || October 20, 1999 || Kitt Peak || Spacewatch ||  || align=right data-sort-value="0.56" | 560 m || 
|-id=488 bgcolor=#fefefe
| 561488 ||  || — || October 22, 2012 || Haleakala || Pan-STARRS ||  || align=right data-sort-value="0.72" | 720 m || 
|-id=489 bgcolor=#fefefe
| 561489 ||  || — || December 31, 2008 || Mount Lemmon || Mount Lemmon Survey ||  || align=right data-sort-value="0.57" | 570 m || 
|-id=490 bgcolor=#E9E9E9
| 561490 ||  || — || September 26, 2011 || Mayhill || N. Falla ||  || align=right data-sort-value="0.81" | 810 m || 
|-id=491 bgcolor=#fefefe
| 561491 ||  || — || October 21, 2011 || Mount Lemmon || Mount Lemmon Survey ||  || align=right data-sort-value="0.69" | 690 m || 
|-id=492 bgcolor=#E9E9E9
| 561492 ||  || — || March 17, 2009 || Kitt Peak || Spacewatch ||  || align=right data-sort-value="0.94" | 940 m || 
|-id=493 bgcolor=#fefefe
| 561493 ||  || — || October 9, 2015 || Haleakala || Pan-STARRS ||  || align=right data-sort-value="0.58" | 580 m || 
|-id=494 bgcolor=#fefefe
| 561494 ||  || — || March 26, 2007 || Kitt Peak || Spacewatch ||  || align=right data-sort-value="0.67" | 670 m || 
|-id=495 bgcolor=#fefefe
| 561495 ||  || — || August 30, 2011 || Haleakala || Pan-STARRS ||  || align=right data-sort-value="0.65" | 650 m || 
|-id=496 bgcolor=#fefefe
| 561496 ||  || — || February 14, 2013 || Haleakala || Pan-STARRS ||  || align=right data-sort-value="0.87" | 870 m || 
|-id=497 bgcolor=#fefefe
| 561497 ||  || — || April 19, 2006 || Kitt Peak || Spacewatch || V || align=right data-sort-value="0.60" | 600 m || 
|-id=498 bgcolor=#fefefe
| 561498 ||  || — || February 16, 2002 || Palomar || NEAT ||  || align=right data-sort-value="0.74" | 740 m || 
|-id=499 bgcolor=#E9E9E9
| 561499 ||  || — || October 23, 2011 || Haleakala || Pan-STARRS ||  || align=right data-sort-value="0.67" | 670 m || 
|-id=500 bgcolor=#E9E9E9
| 561500 ||  || — || October 26, 2011 || Haleakala || Pan-STARRS ||  || align=right | 1.1 km || 
|}

561501–561600 

|-bgcolor=#fefefe
| 561501 ||  || — || December 30, 2005 || Kitt Peak || Spacewatch ||  || align=right data-sort-value="0.67" | 670 m || 
|-id=502 bgcolor=#E9E9E9
| 561502 ||  || — || September 30, 1998 || Kitt Peak || Spacewatch ||  || align=right | 1.5 km || 
|-id=503 bgcolor=#fefefe
| 561503 ||  || — || December 19, 2012 || Oukaimeden || M. Ory ||  || align=right data-sort-value="0.71" | 710 m || 
|-id=504 bgcolor=#fefefe
| 561504 ||  || — || October 25, 2005 || Mount Lemmon || Mount Lemmon Survey ||  || align=right data-sort-value="0.68" | 680 m || 
|-id=505 bgcolor=#fefefe
| 561505 ||  || — || August 21, 2007 || Siding Spring || SSS ||  || align=right data-sort-value="0.99" | 990 m || 
|-id=506 bgcolor=#fefefe
| 561506 ||  || — || January 17, 2013 || Mount Lemmon || Mount Lemmon Survey ||  || align=right data-sort-value="0.76" | 760 m || 
|-id=507 bgcolor=#E9E9E9
| 561507 ||  || — || October 9, 2015 || Haleakala || Pan-STARRS ||  || align=right | 1.0 km || 
|-id=508 bgcolor=#E9E9E9
| 561508 ||  || — || September 1, 2011 || La Sagra || OAM Obs. ||  || align=right | 1.1 km || 
|-id=509 bgcolor=#E9E9E9
| 561509 ||  || — || February 22, 2009 || Kitt Peak || Spacewatch ||  || align=right | 1.2 km || 
|-id=510 bgcolor=#fefefe
| 561510 ||  || — || September 6, 2008 || Mount Lemmon || Mount Lemmon Survey ||  || align=right data-sort-value="0.73" | 730 m || 
|-id=511 bgcolor=#fefefe
| 561511 ||  || — || July 28, 2011 || Haleakala || Pan-STARRS ||  || align=right data-sort-value="0.81" | 810 m || 
|-id=512 bgcolor=#fefefe
| 561512 ||  || — || July 25, 2011 || Haleakala || Pan-STARRS ||  || align=right data-sort-value="0.60" | 600 m || 
|-id=513 bgcolor=#fefefe
| 561513 ||  || — || August 10, 2007 || Kitt Peak || Spacewatch ||  || align=right data-sort-value="0.75" | 750 m || 
|-id=514 bgcolor=#fefefe
| 561514 ||  || — || May 20, 2014 || Haleakala || Pan-STARRS ||  || align=right data-sort-value="0.80" | 800 m || 
|-id=515 bgcolor=#fefefe
| 561515 ||  || — || July 26, 2015 || Haleakala || Pan-STARRS 2 ||  || align=right data-sort-value="0.69" | 690 m || 
|-id=516 bgcolor=#E9E9E9
| 561516 ||  || — || October 1, 2002 || Anderson Mesa || LONEOS ||  || align=right | 1.6 km || 
|-id=517 bgcolor=#fefefe
| 561517 ||  || — || November 20, 2004 || Kitt Peak || Spacewatch ||  || align=right data-sort-value="0.85" | 850 m || 
|-id=518 bgcolor=#fefefe
| 561518 ||  || — || October 9, 2015 || Catalina || CSS ||  || align=right data-sort-value="0.79" | 790 m || 
|-id=519 bgcolor=#E9E9E9
| 561519 ||  || — || January 12, 2008 || Catalina || CSS ||  || align=right | 1.3 km || 
|-id=520 bgcolor=#fefefe
| 561520 ||  || — || September 11, 1996 || Kitt Peak || Spacewatch || NYS || align=right data-sort-value="0.56" | 560 m || 
|-id=521 bgcolor=#fefefe
| 561521 ||  || — || August 26, 2005 || Kitt Peak || LONEOS ||  || align=right data-sort-value="0.74" | 740 m || 
|-id=522 bgcolor=#fefefe
| 561522 ||  || — || May 4, 2014 || Haleakala || Pan-STARRS ||  || align=right data-sort-value="0.71" | 710 m || 
|-id=523 bgcolor=#fefefe
| 561523 ||  || — || September 9, 2004 || Anderson Mesa || LONEOS ||  || align=right data-sort-value="0.69" | 690 m || 
|-id=524 bgcolor=#fefefe
| 561524 ||  || — || August 23, 2011 || Haleakala || Pan-STARRS || NYS || align=right data-sort-value="0.61" | 610 m || 
|-id=525 bgcolor=#fefefe
| 561525 ||  || — || October 25, 1997 || Kitt Peak || Spacewatch || V || align=right data-sort-value="0.57" | 570 m || 
|-id=526 bgcolor=#fefefe
| 561526 ||  || — || September 7, 2004 || Kitt Peak || Spacewatch || (5026) || align=right data-sort-value="0.80" | 800 m || 
|-id=527 bgcolor=#E9E9E9
| 561527 ||  || — || March 11, 2005 || Kitt Peak || M. W. Buie, L. H. Wasserman ||  || align=right | 1.1 km || 
|-id=528 bgcolor=#E9E9E9
| 561528 ||  || — || September 8, 2015 || XuYi || PMO NEO ||  || align=right data-sort-value="0.99" | 990 m || 
|-id=529 bgcolor=#E9E9E9
| 561529 ||  || — || November 18, 2011 || Mount Lemmon || Mount Lemmon Survey ||  || align=right | 1.0 km || 
|-id=530 bgcolor=#E9E9E9
| 561530 ||  || — || November 23, 2011 || Mount Lemmon || Mount Lemmon Survey ||  || align=right data-sort-value="0.94" | 940 m || 
|-id=531 bgcolor=#fefefe
| 561531 ||  || — || October 21, 2008 || Kitt Peak || Spacewatch ||  || align=right data-sort-value="0.77" | 770 m || 
|-id=532 bgcolor=#fefefe
| 561532 ||  || — || September 24, 2008 || Mount Lemmon || Mount Lemmon Survey ||  || align=right data-sort-value="0.75" | 750 m || 
|-id=533 bgcolor=#E9E9E9
| 561533 ||  || — || April 30, 2009 || Kitt Peak || Spacewatch ||  || align=right | 1.4 km || 
|-id=534 bgcolor=#E9E9E9
| 561534 ||  || — || January 13, 2008 || Catalina || CSS ||  || align=right | 1.9 km || 
|-id=535 bgcolor=#fefefe
| 561535 ||  || — || September 25, 2011 || Haleakala || Pan-STARRS ||  || align=right data-sort-value="0.99" | 990 m || 
|-id=536 bgcolor=#fefefe
| 561536 ||  || — || February 20, 2002 || Kitt Peak || Spacewatch ||  || align=right data-sort-value="0.94" | 940 m || 
|-id=537 bgcolor=#E9E9E9
| 561537 ||  || — || October 2, 2011 || Piszkesteto || K. Sárneczky ||  || align=right | 1.00 km || 
|-id=538 bgcolor=#E9E9E9
| 561538 ||  || — || April 6, 2013 || Mayhill-ISON || L. Elenin ||  || align=right | 1.6 km || 
|-id=539 bgcolor=#d6d6d6
| 561539 ||  || — || October 9, 2010 || Mount Lemmon || Mount Lemmon Survey ||  || align=right | 2.1 km || 
|-id=540 bgcolor=#E9E9E9
| 561540 ||  || — || November 30, 2011 || Catalina || CSS ||  || align=right | 1.4 km || 
|-id=541 bgcolor=#E9E9E9
| 561541 ||  || — || April 22, 2009 || Mount Lemmon || Mount Lemmon Survey ||  || align=right | 1.3 km || 
|-id=542 bgcolor=#fefefe
| 561542 ||  || — || August 24, 2001 || Kitt Peak || Spacewatch ||  || align=right data-sort-value="0.57" | 570 m || 
|-id=543 bgcolor=#fefefe
| 561543 ||  || — || October 25, 2005 || Mount Lemmon || Mount Lemmon Survey ||  || align=right data-sort-value="0.81" | 810 m || 
|-id=544 bgcolor=#fefefe
| 561544 ||  || — || February 22, 2014 || Kitt Peak || Spacewatch ||  || align=right data-sort-value="0.52" | 520 m || 
|-id=545 bgcolor=#fefefe
| 561545 ||  || — || September 25, 2008 || Kitt Peak || Spacewatch ||  || align=right data-sort-value="0.62" | 620 m || 
|-id=546 bgcolor=#fefefe
| 561546 ||  || — || April 5, 2003 || Kitt Peak || Spacewatch ||  || align=right data-sort-value="0.75" | 750 m || 
|-id=547 bgcolor=#d6d6d6
| 561547 ||  || — || March 24, 2001 || Kitt Peak || Spacewatch || (1298) || align=right | 2.9 km || 
|-id=548 bgcolor=#fefefe
| 561548 ||  || — || March 12, 2000 || Kitt Peak || Spacewatch ||  || align=right data-sort-value="0.63" | 630 m || 
|-id=549 bgcolor=#E9E9E9
| 561549 ||  || — || October 23, 2011 || Haleakala || Pan-STARRS ||  || align=right | 1.2 km || 
|-id=550 bgcolor=#fefefe
| 561550 ||  || — || September 18, 2015 || Mount Lemmon || Mount Lemmon Survey ||  || align=right data-sort-value="0.62" | 620 m || 
|-id=551 bgcolor=#fefefe
| 561551 ||  || — || December 2, 2004 || Catalina || CSS ||  || align=right data-sort-value="0.83" | 830 m || 
|-id=552 bgcolor=#E9E9E9
| 561552 ||  || — || October 10, 2015 || Space Surveillance || Space Surveillance Telescope ||  || align=right | 1.0 km || 
|-id=553 bgcolor=#fefefe
| 561553 ||  || — || December 29, 2008 || Kitt Peak || Spacewatch ||  || align=right | 1.0 km || 
|-id=554 bgcolor=#E9E9E9
| 561554 ||  || — || June 19, 2010 || Mount Lemmon || Mount Lemmon Survey ||  || align=right | 1.2 km || 
|-id=555 bgcolor=#E9E9E9
| 561555 ||  || — || August 27, 2006 || Kitt Peak || Spacewatch ||  || align=right | 1.5 km || 
|-id=556 bgcolor=#E9E9E9
| 561556 ||  || — || December 28, 2003 || Kitt Peak || Spacewatch || BRG || align=right | 1.3 km || 
|-id=557 bgcolor=#FA8072
| 561557 ||  || — || February 28, 2014 || Haleakala || Pan-STARRS ||  || align=right data-sort-value="0.79" | 790 m || 
|-id=558 bgcolor=#E9E9E9
| 561558 ||  || — || March 9, 2000 || Kitt Peak || Spacewatch ||  || align=right | 2.0 km || 
|-id=559 bgcolor=#fefefe
| 561559 ||  || — || July 2, 2008 || Kitt Peak || Spacewatch ||  || align=right data-sort-value="0.89" | 890 m || 
|-id=560 bgcolor=#FA8072
| 561560 ||  || — || July 25, 2005 || Siding Spring || SSS ||  || align=right data-sort-value="0.72" | 720 m || 
|-id=561 bgcolor=#fefefe
| 561561 ||  || — || December 10, 2005 || Kitt Peak || Spacewatch ||  || align=right data-sort-value="0.90" | 900 m || 
|-id=562 bgcolor=#fefefe
| 561562 ||  || — || September 7, 2004 || Kitt Peak || Spacewatch ||  || align=right data-sort-value="0.74" | 740 m || 
|-id=563 bgcolor=#fefefe
| 561563 ||  || — || October 10, 2008 || Mount Lemmon || Mount Lemmon Survey ||  || align=right data-sort-value="0.90" | 900 m || 
|-id=564 bgcolor=#fefefe
| 561564 ||  || — || April 4, 2010 || Kitt Peak || Spacewatch ||  || align=right data-sort-value="0.99" | 990 m || 
|-id=565 bgcolor=#fefefe
| 561565 ||  || — || April 9, 2010 || Kitt Peak || Spacewatch ||  || align=right data-sort-value="0.72" | 720 m || 
|-id=566 bgcolor=#fefefe
| 561566 ||  || — || November 6, 2005 || Kitt Peak || Spacewatch ||  || align=right data-sort-value="0.58" | 580 m || 
|-id=567 bgcolor=#E9E9E9
| 561567 ||  || — || October 23, 2011 || Haleakala || Pan-STARRS ||  || align=right | 1.1 km || 
|-id=568 bgcolor=#fefefe
| 561568 ||  || — || April 8, 2002 || Kitt Peak || Spacewatch ||  || align=right data-sort-value="0.77" | 770 m || 
|-id=569 bgcolor=#fefefe
| 561569 ||  || — || October 10, 2015 || Haleakala || Pan-STARRS ||  || align=right data-sort-value="0.85" | 850 m || 
|-id=570 bgcolor=#fefefe
| 561570 ||  || — || August 30, 2005 || Kitt Peak || Spacewatch ||  || align=right data-sort-value="0.51" | 510 m || 
|-id=571 bgcolor=#fefefe
| 561571 ||  || — || November 6, 2005 || Kitt Peak || Spacewatch ||  || align=right data-sort-value="0.60" | 600 m || 
|-id=572 bgcolor=#E9E9E9
| 561572 ||  || — || October 11, 2015 || XuYi || PMO NEO ||  || align=right | 1.2 km || 
|-id=573 bgcolor=#fefefe
| 561573 ||  || — || March 12, 2010 || Kitt Peak || Spacewatch ||  || align=right | 1.1 km || 
|-id=574 bgcolor=#fefefe
| 561574 ||  || — || March 24, 2014 || Haleakala || Pan-STARRS ||  || align=right data-sort-value="0.71" | 710 m || 
|-id=575 bgcolor=#fefefe
| 561575 ||  || — || January 28, 2006 || Mount Lemmon || Mount Lemmon Survey ||  || align=right data-sort-value="0.84" | 840 m || 
|-id=576 bgcolor=#fefefe
| 561576 ||  || — || September 23, 2008 || Kitt Peak || Spacewatch ||  || align=right data-sort-value="0.80" | 800 m || 
|-id=577 bgcolor=#E9E9E9
| 561577 ||  || — || June 8, 2005 || Kitt Peak || Spacewatch ||  || align=right | 2.2 km || 
|-id=578 bgcolor=#fefefe
| 561578 ||  || — || April 5, 2014 || Haleakala || Pan-STARRS ||  || align=right data-sort-value="0.83" | 830 m || 
|-id=579 bgcolor=#fefefe
| 561579 ||  || — || February 13, 2002 || Kitt Peak || Spacewatch ||  || align=right data-sort-value="0.67" | 670 m || 
|-id=580 bgcolor=#fefefe
| 561580 ||  || — || August 24, 2011 || Haleakala || Pan-STARRS ||  || align=right data-sort-value="0.69" | 690 m || 
|-id=581 bgcolor=#fefefe
| 561581 ||  || — || August 27, 2002 || Mount Lemmon || NEAT ||  || align=right data-sort-value="0.55" | 550 m || 
|-id=582 bgcolor=#fefefe
| 561582 ||  || — || October 8, 2008 || Mount Lemmon || Mount Lemmon Survey ||  || align=right data-sort-value="0.82" | 820 m || 
|-id=583 bgcolor=#fefefe
| 561583 ||  || — || February 26, 2014 || Haleakala || Pan-STARRS ||  || align=right data-sort-value="0.74" | 740 m || 
|-id=584 bgcolor=#E9E9E9
| 561584 ||  || — || July 25, 2015 || Haleakala || Pan-STARRS ||  || align=right | 1.6 km || 
|-id=585 bgcolor=#fefefe
| 561585 ||  || — || January 10, 2013 || Haleakala || Pan-STARRS ||  || align=right data-sort-value="0.64" | 640 m || 
|-id=586 bgcolor=#fefefe
| 561586 ||  || — || September 6, 2015 || Haleakala || Pan-STARRS ||  || align=right data-sort-value="0.60" | 600 m || 
|-id=587 bgcolor=#fefefe
| 561587 ||  || — || March 12, 2008 || Kitt Peak || Spacewatch ||  || align=right data-sort-value="0.59" | 590 m || 
|-id=588 bgcolor=#fefefe
| 561588 ||  || — || July 25, 2015 || Haleakala || Pan-STARRS ||  || align=right data-sort-value="0.96" | 960 m || 
|-id=589 bgcolor=#fefefe
| 561589 ||  || — || December 22, 2012 || Haleakala || Pan-STARRS ||  || align=right data-sort-value="0.74" | 740 m || 
|-id=590 bgcolor=#E9E9E9
| 561590 ||  || — || December 16, 2003 || Kitt Peak || Spacewatch || BRG || align=right | 1.4 km || 
|-id=591 bgcolor=#fefefe
| 561591 ||  || — || August 23, 2003 || Palomar || NEAT ||  || align=right | 1.1 km || 
|-id=592 bgcolor=#fefefe
| 561592 ||  || — || October 25, 2008 || Mount Lemmon || Mount Lemmon Survey ||  || align=right data-sort-value="0.78" | 780 m || 
|-id=593 bgcolor=#E9E9E9
| 561593 ||  || — || January 12, 2008 || Catalina || CSS ||  || align=right | 1.9 km || 
|-id=594 bgcolor=#E9E9E9
| 561594 ||  || — || August 21, 2015 || Haleakala || Pan-STARRS ||  || align=right data-sort-value="0.76" | 760 m || 
|-id=595 bgcolor=#E9E9E9
| 561595 ||  || — || September 9, 2015 || Haleakala || Pan-STARRS ||  || align=right data-sort-value="0.88" | 880 m || 
|-id=596 bgcolor=#E9E9E9
| 561596 ||  || — || October 26, 2011 || Haleakala || Pan-STARRS ||  || align=right data-sort-value="0.75" | 750 m || 
|-id=597 bgcolor=#E9E9E9
| 561597 ||  || — || October 26, 2011 || Haleakala || Pan-STARRS ||  || align=right data-sort-value="0.83" | 830 m || 
|-id=598 bgcolor=#E9E9E9
| 561598 ||  || — || October 12, 2015 || Haleakala || Pan-STARRS ||  || align=right | 1.6 km || 
|-id=599 bgcolor=#E9E9E9
| 561599 ||  || — || October 12, 2015 || Haleakala || Pan-STARRS ||  || align=right | 1.0 km || 
|-id=600 bgcolor=#E9E9E9
| 561600 ||  || — || January 15, 2008 || Mount Lemmon || Mount Lemmon Survey ||  || align=right | 1.1 km || 
|}

561601–561700 

|-bgcolor=#E9E9E9
| 561601 ||  || — || August 12, 2015 || Haleakala || Pan-STARRS ||  || align=right | 1.1 km || 
|-id=602 bgcolor=#E9E9E9
| 561602 ||  || — || August 17, 2006 || Palomar || NEAT ||  || align=right | 1.7 km || 
|-id=603 bgcolor=#E9E9E9
| 561603 ||  || — || January 11, 2008 || Catalina || CSS ||  || align=right | 1.0 km || 
|-id=604 bgcolor=#fefefe
| 561604 ||  || — || February 15, 2013 || Haleakala || Pan-STARRS ||  || align=right data-sort-value="0.71" | 710 m || 
|-id=605 bgcolor=#fefefe
| 561605 ||  || — || March 10, 2003 || Kitt Peak || Spacewatch ||  || align=right data-sort-value="0.65" | 650 m || 
|-id=606 bgcolor=#E9E9E9
| 561606 ||  || — || September 5, 2010 || Mount Lemmon || Mount Lemmon Survey ||  || align=right | 2.2 km || 
|-id=607 bgcolor=#fefefe
| 561607 ||  || — || November 4, 2004 || Catalina || CSS ||  || align=right data-sort-value="0.84" | 840 m || 
|-id=608 bgcolor=#fefefe
| 561608 ||  || — || August 21, 2015 || Haleakala || Pan-STARRS ||  || align=right data-sort-value="0.72" | 720 m || 
|-id=609 bgcolor=#fefefe
| 561609 ||  || — || July 1, 2008 || Kitt Peak || Spacewatch ||  || align=right data-sort-value="0.71" | 710 m || 
|-id=610 bgcolor=#d6d6d6
| 561610 ||  || — || October 13, 2015 || Haleakala || Pan-STARRS ||  || align=right | 2.6 km || 
|-id=611 bgcolor=#E9E9E9
| 561611 ||  || — || October 13, 2015 || Haleakala || Pan-STARRS ||  || align=right | 1.1 km || 
|-id=612 bgcolor=#E9E9E9
| 561612 ||  || — || April 18, 2013 || Mount Lemmon || Mount Lemmon Survey ||  || align=right | 1.2 km || 
|-id=613 bgcolor=#d6d6d6
| 561613 ||  || — || April 6, 2008 || Mount Lemmon || Mount Lemmon Survey ||  || align=right | 3.1 km || 
|-id=614 bgcolor=#E9E9E9
| 561614 ||  || — || April 20, 2013 || Mount Lemmon || Mount Lemmon Survey ||  || align=right | 1.5 km || 
|-id=615 bgcolor=#E9E9E9
| 561615 ||  || — || October 19, 2006 || Kitt Peak || L. H. Wasserman ||  || align=right data-sort-value="0.77" | 770 m || 
|-id=616 bgcolor=#E9E9E9
| 561616 ||  || — || July 28, 2014 || Haleakala || Pan-STARRS ||  || align=right data-sort-value="0.96" | 960 m || 
|-id=617 bgcolor=#fefefe
| 561617 ||  || — || January 2, 2009 || Mount Lemmon || Mount Lemmon Survey ||  || align=right data-sort-value="0.63" | 630 m || 
|-id=618 bgcolor=#E9E9E9
| 561618 ||  || — || November 13, 2007 || Mount Lemmon || Mount Lemmon Survey ||  || align=right data-sort-value="0.89" | 890 m || 
|-id=619 bgcolor=#fefefe
| 561619 ||  || — || September 14, 2005 || Catalina || CSS ||  || align=right data-sort-value="0.71" | 710 m || 
|-id=620 bgcolor=#E9E9E9
| 561620 ||  || — || December 31, 2007 || Kitt Peak || Spacewatch ||  || align=right | 1.1 km || 
|-id=621 bgcolor=#fefefe
| 561621 ||  || — || February 10, 2013 || Haleakala || Pan-STARRS ||  || align=right data-sort-value="0.60" | 600 m || 
|-id=622 bgcolor=#fefefe
| 561622 ||  || — || May 8, 2014 || Haleakala || Pan-STARRS ||  || align=right data-sort-value="0.64" | 640 m || 
|-id=623 bgcolor=#E9E9E9
| 561623 ||  || — || September 23, 2015 || Catalina || Pan-STARRS ||  || align=right | 1.6 km || 
|-id=624 bgcolor=#fefefe
| 561624 ||  || — || August 21, 2015 || Haleakala || Pan-STARRS ||  || align=right data-sort-value="0.62" | 620 m || 
|-id=625 bgcolor=#fefefe
| 561625 ||  || — || September 14, 2007 || Mount Lemmon || Mount Lemmon Survey ||  || align=right data-sort-value="0.58" | 580 m || 
|-id=626 bgcolor=#fefefe
| 561626 ||  || — || December 29, 2008 || Mount Lemmon || Mount Lemmon Survey ||  || align=right data-sort-value="0.71" | 710 m || 
|-id=627 bgcolor=#E9E9E9
| 561627 ||  || — || March 17, 2013 || Palomar || PTF ||  || align=right data-sort-value="0.82" | 820 m || 
|-id=628 bgcolor=#E9E9E9
| 561628 ||  || — || October 9, 2015 || Haleakala || Pan-STARRS ||  || align=right | 1.2 km || 
|-id=629 bgcolor=#E9E9E9
| 561629 ||  || — || November 3, 2007 || Mount Lemmon || Mount Lemmon Survey ||  || align=right data-sort-value="0.79" | 790 m || 
|-id=630 bgcolor=#fefefe
| 561630 ||  || — || January 1, 2009 || Kitt Peak || Spacewatch ||  || align=right data-sort-value="0.70" | 700 m || 
|-id=631 bgcolor=#fefefe
| 561631 ||  || — || May 11, 2010 || Mount Lemmon || Mount Lemmon Survey ||  || align=right data-sort-value="0.92" | 920 m || 
|-id=632 bgcolor=#fefefe
| 561632 ||  || — || August 24, 2011 || Haleakala || Pan-STARRS ||  || align=right data-sort-value="0.56" | 560 m || 
|-id=633 bgcolor=#fefefe
| 561633 ||  || — || March 19, 2009 || Mount Lemmon || Mount Lemmon Survey ||  || align=right data-sort-value="0.51" | 510 m || 
|-id=634 bgcolor=#fefefe
| 561634 ||  || — || January 16, 2009 || Mount Lemmon || Mount Lemmon Survey ||  || align=right data-sort-value="0.75" | 750 m || 
|-id=635 bgcolor=#fefefe
| 561635 ||  || — || August 28, 2011 || Haleakala || Pan-STARRS ||  || align=right data-sort-value="0.85" | 850 m || 
|-id=636 bgcolor=#fefefe
| 561636 ||  || — || April 30, 2014 || Haleakala || Pan-STARRS ||  || align=right data-sort-value="0.67" | 670 m || 
|-id=637 bgcolor=#fefefe
| 561637 ||  || — || October 10, 2015 || Haleakala || Pan-STARRS ||  || align=right data-sort-value="0.66" | 660 m || 
|-id=638 bgcolor=#E9E9E9
| 561638 ||  || — || October 3, 2015 || Mount Lemmon || Mount Lemmon Survey ||  || align=right data-sort-value="0.93" | 930 m || 
|-id=639 bgcolor=#fefefe
| 561639 ||  || — || September 29, 2011 || Mount Lemmon || Mount Lemmon Survey ||  || align=right data-sort-value="0.70" | 700 m || 
|-id=640 bgcolor=#E9E9E9
| 561640 ||  || — || February 8, 2008 || Kitt Peak || Spacewatch ||  || align=right data-sort-value="0.98" | 980 m || 
|-id=641 bgcolor=#E9E9E9
| 561641 ||  || — || October 8, 2015 || Haleakala || Pan-STARRS ||  || align=right data-sort-value="0.89" | 890 m || 
|-id=642 bgcolor=#E9E9E9
| 561642 ||  || — || January 15, 2008 || Mount Lemmon || Mount Lemmon Survey ||  || align=right data-sort-value="0.87" | 870 m || 
|-id=643 bgcolor=#fefefe
| 561643 ||  || — || September 23, 2011 || Haleakala || Pan-STARRS ||  || align=right data-sort-value="0.68" | 680 m || 
|-id=644 bgcolor=#E9E9E9
| 561644 ||  || — || October 10, 2015 || Haleakala || Pan-STARRS ||  || align=right | 1.5 km || 
|-id=645 bgcolor=#E9E9E9
| 561645 ||  || — || November 18, 2011 || Mount Lemmon || Mount Lemmon Survey ||  || align=right | 1.3 km || 
|-id=646 bgcolor=#fefefe
| 561646 ||  || — || May 4, 2014 || Haleakala || Pan-STARRS ||  || align=right data-sort-value="0.64" | 640 m || 
|-id=647 bgcolor=#fefefe
| 561647 ||  || — || May 7, 2014 || Haleakala || Pan-STARRS ||  || align=right data-sort-value="0.65" | 650 m || 
|-id=648 bgcolor=#fefefe
| 561648 ||  || — || October 10, 2015 || Haleakala || Pan-STARRS ||  || align=right data-sort-value="0.85" | 850 m || 
|-id=649 bgcolor=#E9E9E9
| 561649 ||  || — || October 10, 2015 || Haleakala || Pan-STARRS ||  || align=right | 1.2 km || 
|-id=650 bgcolor=#fefefe
| 561650 ||  || — || May 21, 2014 || Haleakala || Pan-STARRS ||  || align=right data-sort-value="0.80" | 800 m || 
|-id=651 bgcolor=#E9E9E9
| 561651 ||  || — || December 17, 2007 || Mount Lemmon || Mount Lemmon Survey ||  || align=right data-sort-value="0.91" | 910 m || 
|-id=652 bgcolor=#E9E9E9
| 561652 ||  || — || March 23, 2003 || Apache Point || SDSS Collaboration ||  || align=right | 2.4 km || 
|-id=653 bgcolor=#fefefe
| 561653 ||  || — || December 15, 2004 || Kitt Peak || Spacewatch ||  || align=right data-sort-value="0.78" | 780 m || 
|-id=654 bgcolor=#fefefe
| 561654 ||  || — || January 26, 2006 || Mount Lemmon || Mount Lemmon Survey ||  || align=right data-sort-value="0.66" | 660 m || 
|-id=655 bgcolor=#fefefe
| 561655 ||  || — || April 5, 2014 || Haleakala || Pan-STARRS ||  || align=right data-sort-value="0.80" | 800 m || 
|-id=656 bgcolor=#fefefe
| 561656 ||  || — || March 24, 2006 || Mount Lemmon || Mount Lemmon Survey ||  || align=right data-sort-value="0.64" | 640 m || 
|-id=657 bgcolor=#E9E9E9
| 561657 ||  || — || October 10, 2015 || Haleakala || Pan-STARRS ||  || align=right | 1.2 km || 
|-id=658 bgcolor=#E9E9E9
| 561658 ||  || — || October 15, 2015 || Mount Lemmon || Mount Lemmon Survey ||  || align=right | 1.1 km || 
|-id=659 bgcolor=#E9E9E9
| 561659 ||  || — || November 23, 2011 || Mount Lemmon || Mount Lemmon Survey ||  || align=right data-sort-value="0.71" | 710 m || 
|-id=660 bgcolor=#E9E9E9
| 561660 ||  || — || October 10, 2015 || Haleakala || Pan-STARRS ||  || align=right data-sort-value="0.69" | 690 m || 
|-id=661 bgcolor=#E9E9E9
| 561661 ||  || — || October 8, 2015 || Haleakala || Pan-STARRS ||  || align=right data-sort-value="0.81" | 810 m || 
|-id=662 bgcolor=#E9E9E9
| 561662 ||  || — || October 8, 2015 || Haleakala || Pan-STARRS ||  || align=right data-sort-value="0.92" | 920 m || 
|-id=663 bgcolor=#fefefe
| 561663 ||  || — || October 10, 2015 || Haleakala || Pan-STARRS ||  || align=right data-sort-value="0.66" | 660 m || 
|-id=664 bgcolor=#E9E9E9
| 561664 ||  || — || September 24, 2011 || Haleakala || Pan-STARRS ||  || align=right data-sort-value="0.63" | 630 m || 
|-id=665 bgcolor=#d6d6d6
| 561665 ||  || — || October 13, 2015 || Mount Lemmon || Mount Lemmon Survey ||  || align=right | 2.3 km || 
|-id=666 bgcolor=#d6d6d6
| 561666 ||  || — || October 10, 2015 || Haleakala || Pan-STARRS ||  || align=right | 1.6 km || 
|-id=667 bgcolor=#d6d6d6
| 561667 ||  || — || October 13, 2015 || Kitt Peak || Spacewatch ||  || align=right | 1.9 km || 
|-id=668 bgcolor=#d6d6d6
| 561668 ||  || — || October 10, 2015 || Haleakala || Pan-STARRS ||  || align=right | 1.5 km || 
|-id=669 bgcolor=#fefefe
| 561669 ||  || — || January 16, 2009 || Mount Lemmon || Mount Lemmon Survey ||  || align=right data-sort-value="0.87" | 870 m || 
|-id=670 bgcolor=#d6d6d6
| 561670 ||  || — || September 11, 2015 || Haleakala || Pan-STARRS ||  || align=right | 2.0 km || 
|-id=671 bgcolor=#fefefe
| 561671 ||  || — || August 25, 2011 || Bergisch Gladbach || W. Bickel ||  || align=right data-sort-value="0.70" | 700 m || 
|-id=672 bgcolor=#fefefe
| 561672 ||  || — || October 7, 2008 || Mount Lemmon || Mount Lemmon Survey ||  || align=right data-sort-value="0.60" | 600 m || 
|-id=673 bgcolor=#fefefe
| 561673 ||  || — || October 27, 2005 || Catalina || CSS ||  || align=right data-sort-value="0.77" | 770 m || 
|-id=674 bgcolor=#E9E9E9
| 561674 ||  || — || December 14, 2003 || Palomar || NEAT ||  || align=right | 1.4 km || 
|-id=675 bgcolor=#E9E9E9
| 561675 ||  || — || December 27, 2011 || Catalina || CSS ||  || align=right data-sort-value="0.94" | 940 m || 
|-id=676 bgcolor=#fefefe
| 561676 ||  || — || October 13, 2004 || Kitt Peak || Spacewatch ||  || align=right data-sort-value="0.66" | 660 m || 
|-id=677 bgcolor=#fefefe
| 561677 ||  || — || January 7, 2013 || Mount Lemmon || Mount Lemmon Survey ||  || align=right data-sort-value="0.58" | 580 m || 
|-id=678 bgcolor=#fefefe
| 561678 ||  || — || September 20, 2011 || Haleakala || Pan-STARRS ||  || align=right data-sort-value="0.65" | 650 m || 
|-id=679 bgcolor=#fefefe
| 561679 ||  || — || March 13, 2002 || Kitt Peak || Spacewatch ||  || align=right data-sort-value="0.72" | 720 m || 
|-id=680 bgcolor=#fefefe
| 561680 ||  || — || September 23, 2008 || Kitt Peak || Mount Lemmon Survey ||  || align=right data-sort-value="0.61" | 610 m || 
|-id=681 bgcolor=#fefefe
| 561681 ||  || — || April 8, 2002 || Kitt Peak || Spacewatch ||  || align=right data-sort-value="0.77" | 770 m || 
|-id=682 bgcolor=#fefefe
| 561682 ||  || — || January 20, 2009 || Catalina || CSS ||  || align=right data-sort-value="0.65" | 650 m || 
|-id=683 bgcolor=#fefefe
| 561683 ||  || — || March 9, 2002 || Kitt Peak || Spacewatch ||  || align=right data-sort-value="0.86" | 860 m || 
|-id=684 bgcolor=#E9E9E9
| 561684 ||  || — || April 10, 2013 || Haleakala || Pan-STARRS ||  || align=right | 1.4 km || 
|-id=685 bgcolor=#fefefe
| 561685 ||  || — || May 3, 2014 || Kitt Peak || Mount Lemmon Survey ||  || align=right data-sort-value="0.65" | 650 m || 
|-id=686 bgcolor=#fefefe
| 561686 ||  || — || January 19, 2013 || Mount Lemmon || Mount Lemmon Survey ||  || align=right data-sort-value="0.80" | 800 m || 
|-id=687 bgcolor=#d6d6d6
| 561687 ||  || — || April 27, 2012 || Haleakala || Pan-STARRS ||  || align=right | 2.6 km || 
|-id=688 bgcolor=#fefefe
| 561688 ||  || — || October 31, 2008 || Kitt Peak || Spacewatch ||  || align=right data-sort-value="0.59" | 590 m || 
|-id=689 bgcolor=#fefefe
| 561689 ||  || — || April 23, 2011 || Haleakala || Pan-STARRS ||  || align=right data-sort-value="0.52" | 520 m || 
|-id=690 bgcolor=#fefefe
| 561690 ||  || — || February 20, 2002 || Kitt Peak || Spacewatch ||  || align=right data-sort-value="0.61" | 610 m || 
|-id=691 bgcolor=#fefefe
| 561691 ||  || — || December 14, 2004 || Kitt Peak || Spacewatch ||  || align=right data-sort-value="0.68" | 680 m || 
|-id=692 bgcolor=#fefefe
| 561692 ||  || — || October 12, 2015 || Haleakala || Pan-STARRS ||  || align=right data-sort-value="0.68" | 680 m || 
|-id=693 bgcolor=#fefefe
| 561693 ||  || — || October 9, 2015 || Mount Lemmon || Mount Lemmon Survey ||  || align=right data-sort-value="0.60" | 600 m || 
|-id=694 bgcolor=#fefefe
| 561694 ||  || — || February 7, 2013 || Catalina || CSS ||  || align=right data-sort-value="0.89" | 890 m || 
|-id=695 bgcolor=#E9E9E9
| 561695 ||  || — || October 23, 2011 || Haleakala || Pan-STARRS ||  || align=right data-sort-value="0.65" | 650 m || 
|-id=696 bgcolor=#fefefe
| 561696 ||  || — || March 25, 2014 || Mount Lemmon || Mount Lemmon Survey ||  || align=right data-sort-value="0.81" | 810 m || 
|-id=697 bgcolor=#E9E9E9
| 561697 ||  || — || January 11, 2008 || Mount Lemmon || Mount Lemmon Survey ||  || align=right data-sort-value="0.55" | 550 m || 
|-id=698 bgcolor=#fefefe
| 561698 ||  || — || August 20, 2011 || Haleakala || Pan-STARRS ||  || align=right data-sort-value="0.71" | 710 m || 
|-id=699 bgcolor=#fefefe
| 561699 ||  || — || August 27, 2001 || Palomar || NEAT ||  || align=right data-sort-value="0.89" | 890 m || 
|-id=700 bgcolor=#fefefe
| 561700 ||  || — || July 28, 2011 || Haleakala || Pan-STARRS ||  || align=right data-sort-value="0.64" | 640 m || 
|}

561701–561800 

|-bgcolor=#fefefe
| 561701 ||  || — || July 27, 2014 || Haleakala || Pan-STARRS ||  || align=right data-sort-value="0.72" | 720 m || 
|-id=702 bgcolor=#fefefe
| 561702 ||  || — || November 20, 2000 || Socorro || LINEAR ||  || align=right data-sort-value="0.87" | 870 m || 
|-id=703 bgcolor=#fefefe
| 561703 ||  || — || June 23, 2011 || Mount Lemmon || Mount Lemmon Survey ||  || align=right data-sort-value="0.64" | 640 m || 
|-id=704 bgcolor=#E9E9E9
| 561704 ||  || — || April 17, 2013 || Haleakala || Pan-STARRS ||  || align=right data-sort-value="0.97" | 970 m || 
|-id=705 bgcolor=#fefefe
| 561705 ||  || — || October 9, 2015 || Haleakala || Pan-STARRS ||  || align=right data-sort-value="0.59" | 590 m || 
|-id=706 bgcolor=#fefefe
| 561706 ||  || — || December 2, 2008 || Mount Lemmon || Mount Lemmon Survey ||  || align=right | 1.1 km || 
|-id=707 bgcolor=#E9E9E9
| 561707 ||  || — || October 21, 2015 || Haleakala || Pan-STARRS ||  || align=right data-sort-value="0.84" | 840 m || 
|-id=708 bgcolor=#E9E9E9
| 561708 ||  || — || October 21, 2015 || Palomar || PTF ||  || align=right | 1.3 km || 
|-id=709 bgcolor=#E9E9E9
| 561709 ||  || — || September 18, 2006 || Catalina || CSS ||  || align=right | 2.1 km || 
|-id=710 bgcolor=#E9E9E9
| 561710 ||  || — || November 25, 2011 || Haleakala || Pan-STARRS ||  || align=right | 1.3 km || 
|-id=711 bgcolor=#E9E9E9
| 561711 ||  || — || August 29, 2006 || Kitt Peak || Spacewatch ||  || align=right | 1.2 km || 
|-id=712 bgcolor=#E9E9E9
| 561712 ||  || — || November 17, 2011 || Mount Lemmon || Mount Lemmon Survey ||  || align=right | 1.1 km || 
|-id=713 bgcolor=#E9E9E9
| 561713 ||  || — || November 11, 2007 || Mount Lemmon || Mount Lemmon Survey ||  || align=right data-sort-value="0.88" | 880 m || 
|-id=714 bgcolor=#E9E9E9
| 561714 ||  || — || December 22, 2003 || Kitt Peak || Spacewatch ||  || align=right | 1.1 km || 
|-id=715 bgcolor=#fefefe
| 561715 ||  || — || November 20, 2008 || Kitt Peak || Spacewatch ||  || align=right data-sort-value="0.63" | 630 m || 
|-id=716 bgcolor=#fefefe
| 561716 ||  || — || March 28, 2014 || Mount Lemmon || Mount Lemmon Survey ||  || align=right data-sort-value="0.83" | 830 m || 
|-id=717 bgcolor=#fefefe
| 561717 ||  || — || October 17, 1998 || Kitt Peak || Spacewatch ||  || align=right data-sort-value="0.75" | 750 m || 
|-id=718 bgcolor=#fefefe
| 561718 ||  || — || May 4, 2014 || Haleakala || Pan-STARRS ||  || align=right data-sort-value="0.98" | 980 m || 
|-id=719 bgcolor=#fefefe
| 561719 ||  || — || January 20, 2009 || Kitt Peak || Spacewatch ||  || align=right data-sort-value="0.57" | 570 m || 
|-id=720 bgcolor=#E9E9E9
| 561720 ||  || — || October 24, 2015 || Haleakala || Pan-STARRS ||  || align=right data-sort-value="0.83" | 830 m || 
|-id=721 bgcolor=#E9E9E9
| 561721 ||  || — || October 22, 2011 || Mount Lemmon || Mount Lemmon Survey ||  || align=right | 1.3 km || 
|-id=722 bgcolor=#E9E9E9
| 561722 ||  || — || November 11, 2007 || Mount Lemmon || Mount Lemmon Survey ||  || align=right | 2.0 km || 
|-id=723 bgcolor=#fefefe
| 561723 ||  || — || May 27, 2014 || Kitt Peak || Mount Lemmon Survey ||  || align=right | 1.0 km || 
|-id=724 bgcolor=#E9E9E9
| 561724 ||  || — || September 9, 2015 || Haleakala || Pan-STARRS ||  || align=right | 1.4 km || 
|-id=725 bgcolor=#fefefe
| 561725 ||  || — || October 26, 2001 || Palomar || NEAT ||  || align=right data-sort-value="0.92" | 920 m || 
|-id=726 bgcolor=#E9E9E9
| 561726 ||  || — || August 14, 2002 || Palomar || NEAT ||  || align=right | 1.6 km || 
|-id=727 bgcolor=#E9E9E9
| 561727 ||  || — || October 24, 2015 || Haleakala || Pan-STARRS ||  || align=right | 1.2 km || 
|-id=728 bgcolor=#E9E9E9
| 561728 ||  || — || November 18, 2007 || Mount Lemmon || Mount Lemmon Survey ||  || align=right data-sort-value="0.79" | 790 m || 
|-id=729 bgcolor=#E9E9E9
| 561729 ||  || — || December 4, 2007 || Kitt Peak || Spacewatch ||  || align=right data-sort-value="0.92" | 920 m || 
|-id=730 bgcolor=#fefefe
| 561730 ||  || — || December 5, 2005 || Kitt Peak || Spacewatch ||  || align=right data-sort-value="0.69" | 690 m || 
|-id=731 bgcolor=#E9E9E9
| 561731 ||  || — || August 21, 2015 || Haleakala || Pan-STARRS ||  || align=right data-sort-value="0.99" | 990 m || 
|-id=732 bgcolor=#E9E9E9
| 561732 ||  || — || August 12, 2015 || Haleakala || Pan-STARRS ||  || align=right | 1.2 km || 
|-id=733 bgcolor=#E9E9E9
| 561733 ||  || — || August 29, 2006 || Catalina || CSS ||  || align=right | 1.4 km || 
|-id=734 bgcolor=#E9E9E9
| 561734 ||  || — || October 11, 2007 || Catalina || CSS ||  || align=right data-sort-value="0.99" | 990 m || 
|-id=735 bgcolor=#fefefe
| 561735 ||  || — || September 13, 2007 || Mount Lemmon || Mount Lemmon Survey ||  || align=right data-sort-value="0.58" | 580 m || 
|-id=736 bgcolor=#E9E9E9
| 561736 ||  || — || December 13, 2006 || Catalina || CSS ||  || align=right | 2.1 km || 
|-id=737 bgcolor=#E9E9E9
| 561737 ||  || — || September 1, 2002 || Saint-Sulpice || NEAT ||  || align=right data-sort-value="0.87" | 870 m || 
|-id=738 bgcolor=#E9E9E9
| 561738 ||  || — || October 21, 2015 || Haleakala || Pan-STARRS ||  || align=right | 1.3 km || 
|-id=739 bgcolor=#E9E9E9
| 561739 ||  || — || December 16, 2007 || Mount Lemmon || Mount Lemmon Survey ||  || align=right | 1.1 km || 
|-id=740 bgcolor=#E9E9E9
| 561740 ||  || — || August 26, 2014 || Haleakala || Pan-STARRS ||  || align=right | 1.1 km || 
|-id=741 bgcolor=#fefefe
| 561741 ||  || — || February 15, 2013 || Haleakala || Pan-STARRS ||  || align=right data-sort-value="0.75" | 750 m || 
|-id=742 bgcolor=#fefefe
| 561742 ||  || — || August 27, 2011 || Haleakala || Pan-STARRS ||  || align=right data-sort-value="0.90" | 900 m || 
|-id=743 bgcolor=#E9E9E9
| 561743 ||  || — || November 7, 2007 || Kitt Peak || Spacewatch ||  || align=right data-sort-value="0.80" | 800 m || 
|-id=744 bgcolor=#E9E9E9
| 561744 ||  || — || September 28, 2006 || Mount Lemmon || Mount Lemmon Survey ||  || align=right | 2.1 km || 
|-id=745 bgcolor=#d6d6d6
| 561745 ||  || — || October 24, 2015 || Haleakala || Pan-STARRS ||  || align=right | 2.1 km || 
|-id=746 bgcolor=#fefefe
| 561746 ||  || — || November 20, 2008 || Mount Lemmon || Mount Lemmon Survey ||  || align=right | 1.3 km || 
|-id=747 bgcolor=#fefefe
| 561747 ||  || — || April 23, 2014 || Cerro Tololo-DECam || CTIO-DECam ||  || align=right data-sort-value="0.53" | 530 m || 
|-id=748 bgcolor=#E9E9E9
| 561748 ||  || — || October 25, 2011 || Haleakala || Pan-STARRS ||  || align=right data-sort-value="0.83" | 830 m || 
|-id=749 bgcolor=#E9E9E9
| 561749 ||  || — || November 1, 2015 || Haleakala || Pan-STARRS ||  || align=right | 1.2 km || 
|-id=750 bgcolor=#fefefe
| 561750 ||  || — || September 6, 2008 || Mount Lemmon || Mount Lemmon Survey ||  || align=right data-sort-value="0.55" | 550 m || 
|-id=751 bgcolor=#fefefe
| 561751 ||  || — || November 24, 2008 || Kitt Peak || Spacewatch ||  || align=right data-sort-value="0.67" | 670 m || 
|-id=752 bgcolor=#fefefe
| 561752 ||  || — || October 8, 2004 || Kitt Peak || Spacewatch ||  || align=right data-sort-value="0.71" | 710 m || 
|-id=753 bgcolor=#fefefe
| 561753 ||  || — || November 2, 2000 || Kitt Peak || Spacewatch ||  || align=right data-sort-value="0.81" | 810 m || 
|-id=754 bgcolor=#E9E9E9
| 561754 ||  || — || October 18, 2011 || Mount Lemmon || Mount Lemmon Survey ||  || align=right data-sort-value="0.78" | 780 m || 
|-id=755 bgcolor=#E9E9E9
| 561755 ||  || — || October 20, 2011 || Mount Lemmon || Mount Lemmon Survey ||  || align=right data-sort-value="0.71" | 710 m || 
|-id=756 bgcolor=#E9E9E9
| 561756 ||  || — || September 27, 2006 || Mount Lemmon || Mount Lemmon Survey ||  || align=right | 1.5 km || 
|-id=757 bgcolor=#E9E9E9
| 561757 ||  || — || October 18, 2007 || Mount Lemmon || Mount Lemmon Survey ||  || align=right data-sort-value="0.79" | 790 m || 
|-id=758 bgcolor=#d6d6d6
| 561758 ||  || — || October 17, 2010 || Mount Lemmon || Mount Lemmon Survey ||  || align=right | 2.2 km || 
|-id=759 bgcolor=#fefefe
| 561759 ||  || — || November 1, 2015 || Kitt Peak || Spacewatch ||  || align=right data-sort-value="0.84" | 840 m || 
|-id=760 bgcolor=#E9E9E9
| 561760 ||  || — || March 8, 2008 || Kitt Peak || Spacewatch ||  || align=right | 1.1 km || 
|-id=761 bgcolor=#fefefe
| 561761 ||  || — || September 29, 2011 || Mount Lemmon || Mount Lemmon Survey ||  || align=right data-sort-value="0.72" | 720 m || 
|-id=762 bgcolor=#fefefe
| 561762 ||  || — || September 18, 2003 || Kitt Peak || Spacewatch ||  || align=right data-sort-value="0.85" | 850 m || 
|-id=763 bgcolor=#fefefe
| 561763 ||  || — || September 19, 2011 || Haleakala || Pan-STARRS ||  || align=right data-sort-value="0.76" | 760 m || 
|-id=764 bgcolor=#fefefe
| 561764 ||  || — || October 10, 2015 || Haleakala || Pan-STARRS ||  || align=right data-sort-value="0.86" | 860 m || 
|-id=765 bgcolor=#fefefe
| 561765 ||  || — || September 22, 2011 || Kitt Peak || Spacewatch ||  || align=right data-sort-value="0.93" | 930 m || 
|-id=766 bgcolor=#fefefe
| 561766 ||  || — || September 19, 2011 || Haleakala || Pan-STARRS ||  || align=right data-sort-value="0.64" | 640 m || 
|-id=767 bgcolor=#E9E9E9
| 561767 ||  || — || January 20, 2008 || Mount Lemmon || Mount Lemmon Survey ||  || align=right | 1.4 km || 
|-id=768 bgcolor=#E9E9E9
| 561768 ||  || — || October 20, 2011 || Mount Lemmon || Mount Lemmon Survey ||  || align=right data-sort-value="0.69" | 690 m || 
|-id=769 bgcolor=#E9E9E9
| 561769 ||  || — || December 30, 2007 || Kitt Peak || Spacewatch ||  || align=right | 1.0 km || 
|-id=770 bgcolor=#E9E9E9
| 561770 ||  || — || December 13, 1998 || Kitt Peak || Spacewatch ||  || align=right | 1.1 km || 
|-id=771 bgcolor=#fefefe
| 561771 ||  || — || January 6, 2006 || Mount Lemmon || Mount Lemmon Survey ||  || align=right | 1.1 km || 
|-id=772 bgcolor=#E9E9E9
| 561772 ||  || — || October 26, 2011 || Haleakala || Pan-STARRS ||  || align=right data-sort-value="0.80" | 800 m || 
|-id=773 bgcolor=#E9E9E9
| 561773 ||  || — || November 25, 2011 || Palomar || Pan-STARRS ||  || align=right | 1.3 km || 
|-id=774 bgcolor=#E9E9E9
| 561774 ||  || — || March 3, 2009 || Kitt Peak || Spacewatch ||  || align=right data-sort-value="0.98" | 980 m || 
|-id=775 bgcolor=#fefefe
| 561775 ||  || — || November 8, 2009 || Mount Lemmon || Mount Lemmon Survey ||  || align=right data-sort-value="0.76" | 760 m || 
|-id=776 bgcolor=#fefefe
| 561776 ||  || — || January 16, 2013 || Mount Lemmon || Mount Lemmon Survey ||  || align=right data-sort-value="0.71" | 710 m || 
|-id=777 bgcolor=#fefefe
| 561777 ||  || — || November 11, 2004 || Kitt Peak || Spacewatch ||  || align=right data-sort-value="0.63" | 630 m || 
|-id=778 bgcolor=#fefefe
| 561778 ||  || — || July 28, 2011 || Siding Spring || SSS ||  || align=right data-sort-value="0.73" | 730 m || 
|-id=779 bgcolor=#fefefe
| 561779 ||  || — || November 17, 2008 || Kitt Peak || Spacewatch ||  || align=right data-sort-value="0.99" | 990 m || 
|-id=780 bgcolor=#fefefe
| 561780 ||  || — || February 2, 2009 || Mount Lemmon || Mount Lemmon Survey ||  || align=right data-sort-value="0.63" | 630 m || 
|-id=781 bgcolor=#fefefe
| 561781 ||  || — || May 1, 2014 || ESA OGS || ESA OGS ||  || align=right data-sort-value="0.72" | 720 m || 
|-id=782 bgcolor=#fefefe
| 561782 ||  || — || February 3, 2013 || Haleakala || Pan-STARRS ||  || align=right data-sort-value="0.91" | 910 m || 
|-id=783 bgcolor=#E9E9E9
| 561783 ||  || — || March 15, 2013 || Kitt Peak || Spacewatch ||  || align=right | 1.1 km || 
|-id=784 bgcolor=#E9E9E9
| 561784 ||  || — || January 2, 2012 || Mount Lemmon || Mount Lemmon Survey ||  || align=right data-sort-value="0.90" | 900 m || 
|-id=785 bgcolor=#E9E9E9
| 561785 ||  || — || October 9, 2015 || Kitt Peak || Pan-STARRS ||  || align=right | 1.0 km || 
|-id=786 bgcolor=#fefefe
| 561786 ||  || — || October 1, 2008 || Mount Lemmon || Mount Lemmon Survey ||  || align=right data-sort-value="0.56" | 560 m || 
|-id=787 bgcolor=#fefefe
| 561787 ||  || — || September 8, 2004 || Socorro || LINEAR ||  || align=right data-sort-value="0.79" | 790 m || 
|-id=788 bgcolor=#fefefe
| 561788 ||  || — || February 10, 2010 || Kitt Peak || Spacewatch ||  || align=right data-sort-value="0.76" | 760 m || 
|-id=789 bgcolor=#fefefe
| 561789 ||  || — || April 24, 2011 || Kitt Peak || Spacewatch ||  || align=right data-sort-value="0.79" | 790 m || 
|-id=790 bgcolor=#fefefe
| 561790 ||  || — || September 23, 2011 || Haleakala || Pan-STARRS ||  || align=right data-sort-value="0.66" | 660 m || 
|-id=791 bgcolor=#fefefe
| 561791 ||  || — || November 7, 2008 || Mount Lemmon || Mount Lemmon Survey ||  || align=right data-sort-value="0.89" | 890 m || 
|-id=792 bgcolor=#E9E9E9
| 561792 ||  || — || April 2, 2009 || Mount Lemmon || Mount Lemmon Survey ||  || align=right data-sort-value="0.85" | 850 m || 
|-id=793 bgcolor=#E9E9E9
| 561793 ||  || — || March 11, 2005 || Mount Lemmon || Mount Lemmon Survey ||  || align=right | 1.0 km || 
|-id=794 bgcolor=#E9E9E9
| 561794 ||  || — || May 5, 2013 || Haleakala || Pan-STARRS ||  || align=right data-sort-value="0.98" | 980 m || 
|-id=795 bgcolor=#E9E9E9
| 561795 ||  || — || January 1, 2008 || Catalina || CSS ||  || align=right | 1.4 km || 
|-id=796 bgcolor=#E9E9E9
| 561796 ||  || — || January 1, 2008 || Kitt Peak || Spacewatch ||  || align=right data-sort-value="0.96" | 960 m || 
|-id=797 bgcolor=#E9E9E9
| 561797 ||  || — || April 13, 2013 || Haleakala || Pan-STARRS ||  || align=right | 1.1 km || 
|-id=798 bgcolor=#E9E9E9
| 561798 ||  || — || October 28, 2011 || Mount Lemmon || Mount Lemmon Survey ||  || align=right data-sort-value="0.67" | 670 m || 
|-id=799 bgcolor=#fefefe
| 561799 ||  || — || May 21, 2014 || Haleakala || Pan-STARRS ||  || align=right data-sort-value="0.83" | 830 m || 
|-id=800 bgcolor=#fefefe
| 561800 ||  || — || October 7, 2008 || Mount Lemmon || Mount Lemmon Survey ||  || align=right data-sort-value="0.56" | 560 m || 
|}

561801–561900 

|-bgcolor=#fefefe
| 561801 ||  || — || June 27, 2011 || Mount Lemmon || Mount Lemmon Survey ||  || align=right data-sort-value="0.76" | 760 m || 
|-id=802 bgcolor=#fefefe
| 561802 ||  || — || November 22, 2008 || Kitt Peak || Spacewatch ||  || align=right data-sort-value="0.75" | 750 m || 
|-id=803 bgcolor=#E9E9E9
| 561803 ||  || — || October 25, 2011 || Haleakala || Pan-STARRS ||  || align=right data-sort-value="0.96" | 960 m || 
|-id=804 bgcolor=#E9E9E9
| 561804 ||  || — || October 26, 2011 || Haleakala || Pan-STARRS ||  || align=right data-sort-value="0.47" | 470 m || 
|-id=805 bgcolor=#fefefe
| 561805 ||  || — || August 21, 2008 || Kitt Peak || Spacewatch ||  || align=right data-sort-value="0.60" | 600 m || 
|-id=806 bgcolor=#d6d6d6
| 561806 ||  || — || May 10, 2014 || Haleakala || Pan-STARRS ||  || align=right | 2.0 km || 
|-id=807 bgcolor=#E9E9E9
| 561807 ||  || — || December 18, 2007 || Mount Lemmon || Mount Lemmon Survey ||  || align=right data-sort-value="0.63" | 630 m || 
|-id=808 bgcolor=#fefefe
| 561808 ||  || — || September 29, 2008 || Mount Lemmon || Mount Lemmon Survey ||  || align=right data-sort-value="0.87" | 870 m || 
|-id=809 bgcolor=#E9E9E9
| 561809 ||  || — || March 11, 2008 || Catalina || CSS ||  || align=right | 1.2 km || 
|-id=810 bgcolor=#fefefe
| 561810 ||  || — || August 29, 2005 || Palomar || NEAT ||  || align=right data-sort-value="0.90" | 900 m || 
|-id=811 bgcolor=#fefefe
| 561811 ||  || — || January 19, 2013 || Kitt Peak || Spacewatch ||  || align=right data-sort-value="0.66" | 660 m || 
|-id=812 bgcolor=#fefefe
| 561812 ||  || — || December 30, 2008 || Kitt Peak || Spacewatch ||  || align=right data-sort-value="0.68" | 680 m || 
|-id=813 bgcolor=#E9E9E9
| 561813 ||  || — || October 12, 2006 || Palomar || NEAT ||  || align=right | 1.5 km || 
|-id=814 bgcolor=#E9E9E9
| 561814 ||  || — || July 25, 2015 || Haleakala || Pan-STARRS ||  || align=right | 1.3 km || 
|-id=815 bgcolor=#fefefe
| 561815 ||  || — || April 19, 2007 || Kitt Peak || Spacewatch ||  || align=right data-sort-value="0.67" | 670 m || 
|-id=816 bgcolor=#fefefe
| 561816 ||  || — || March 13, 2010 || Mount Lemmon || Mount Lemmon Survey ||  || align=right data-sort-value="0.62" | 620 m || 
|-id=817 bgcolor=#fefefe
| 561817 ||  || — || November 14, 2001 || Kitt Peak || Spacewatch ||  || align=right data-sort-value="0.58" | 580 m || 
|-id=818 bgcolor=#fefefe
| 561818 ||  || — || November 10, 2004 || Kitt Peak || Spacewatch ||  || align=right data-sort-value="0.68" | 680 m || 
|-id=819 bgcolor=#fefefe
| 561819 ||  || — || February 6, 2013 || Nogales || M. Schwartz, P. R. Holvorcem ||  || align=right data-sort-value="0.98" | 980 m || 
|-id=820 bgcolor=#E9E9E9
| 561820 ||  || — || October 30, 2011 || Ka-Dar || V. Gerke ||  || align=right data-sort-value="0.94" | 940 m || 
|-id=821 bgcolor=#fefefe
| 561821 ||  || — || November 18, 2008 || Kitt Peak || Spacewatch ||  || align=right data-sort-value="0.78" | 780 m || 
|-id=822 bgcolor=#fefefe
| 561822 ||  || — || February 20, 2009 || Kitt Peak || Spacewatch ||  || align=right data-sort-value="0.66" | 660 m || 
|-id=823 bgcolor=#E9E9E9
| 561823 ||  || — || December 15, 2006 || Kitt Peak || Spacewatch ||  || align=right | 2.1 km || 
|-id=824 bgcolor=#E9E9E9
| 561824 ||  || — || October 13, 1998 || Kitt Peak || Spacewatch ||  || align=right | 1.0 km || 
|-id=825 bgcolor=#E9E9E9
| 561825 ||  || — || October 20, 2007 || Mount Lemmon || Mount Lemmon Survey ||  || align=right data-sort-value="0.99" | 990 m || 
|-id=826 bgcolor=#E9E9E9
| 561826 ||  || — || July 31, 2006 || Catalina || SSS || MAR || align=right | 1.6 km || 
|-id=827 bgcolor=#fefefe
| 561827 ||  || — || August 21, 2015 || Haleakala || Pan-STARRS ||  || align=right data-sort-value="0.64" | 640 m || 
|-id=828 bgcolor=#fefefe
| 561828 ||  || — || January 18, 2013 || Mount Lemmon || Mount Lemmon Survey ||  || align=right data-sort-value="0.80" | 800 m || 
|-id=829 bgcolor=#d6d6d6
| 561829 ||  || — || November 10, 2010 || Mount Lemmon || Mount Lemmon Survey ||  || align=right | 2.4 km || 
|-id=830 bgcolor=#fefefe
| 561830 ||  || — || May 3, 2003 || Kitt Peak || Spacewatch ||  || align=right data-sort-value="0.93" | 930 m || 
|-id=831 bgcolor=#fefefe
| 561831 ||  || — || July 26, 2011 || Haleakala || Pan-STARRS ||  || align=right data-sort-value="0.72" | 720 m || 
|-id=832 bgcolor=#fefefe
| 561832 ||  || — || September 26, 1992 || Kitt Peak || Spacewatch ||  || align=right data-sort-value="0.52" | 520 m || 
|-id=833 bgcolor=#E9E9E9
| 561833 ||  || — || October 23, 2011 || Kitt Peak || Spacewatch ||  || align=right | 1.0 km || 
|-id=834 bgcolor=#E9E9E9
| 561834 ||  || — || September 19, 2006 || Catalina || CSS ||  || align=right | 2.8 km || 
|-id=835 bgcolor=#fefefe
| 561835 ||  || — || September 21, 2011 || Haleakala || Pan-STARRS ||  || align=right data-sort-value="0.70" | 700 m || 
|-id=836 bgcolor=#E9E9E9
| 561836 ||  || — || March 25, 2000 || Kitt Peak || Spacewatch ||  || align=right | 1.7 km || 
|-id=837 bgcolor=#E9E9E9
| 561837 ||  || — || February 12, 2004 || Kitt Peak || Spacewatch ||  || align=right | 1.7 km || 
|-id=838 bgcolor=#E9E9E9
| 561838 ||  || — || November 2, 2015 || Space Surveillance || Space Surveillance Telescope ||  || align=right data-sort-value="0.96" | 960 m || 
|-id=839 bgcolor=#E9E9E9
| 561839 ||  || — || September 27, 2006 || Mount Lemmon || Mount Lemmon Survey ||  || align=right | 1.4 km || 
|-id=840 bgcolor=#E9E9E9
| 561840 ||  || — || October 28, 2011 || Mount Lemmon || Mount Lemmon Survey ||  || align=right | 1.6 km || 
|-id=841 bgcolor=#fefefe
| 561841 ||  || — || December 22, 2008 || Kitt Peak || Spacewatch ||  || align=right data-sort-value="0.84" | 840 m || 
|-id=842 bgcolor=#d6d6d6
| 561842 ||  || — || November 26, 2010 || Mount Lemmon || Mount Lemmon Survey ||  || align=right | 2.4 km || 
|-id=843 bgcolor=#E9E9E9
| 561843 ||  || — || November 20, 2011 || Kitt Peak || Spacewatch ||  || align=right | 1.3 km || 
|-id=844 bgcolor=#fefefe
| 561844 ||  || — || September 19, 2011 || Haleakala || Pan-STARRS ||  || align=right data-sort-value="0.81" | 810 m || 
|-id=845 bgcolor=#fefefe
| 561845 ||  || — || November 1, 2015 || Catalina || CSS ||  || align=right data-sort-value="0.63" | 630 m || 
|-id=846 bgcolor=#E9E9E9
| 561846 ||  || — || October 25, 2011 || Kitt Peak || Spacewatch ||  || align=right data-sort-value="0.80" | 800 m || 
|-id=847 bgcolor=#fefefe
| 561847 ||  || — || November 1, 2015 || Kitt Peak || Spacewatch || NYS || align=right data-sort-value="0.59" | 590 m || 
|-id=848 bgcolor=#E9E9E9
| 561848 ||  || — || October 22, 2006 || Mount Lemmon || Mount Lemmon Survey || EUN || align=right data-sort-value="0.99" | 990 m || 
|-id=849 bgcolor=#fefefe
| 561849 ||  || — || November 20, 2008 || Mount Lemmon || Mount Lemmon Survey ||  || align=right data-sort-value="0.62" | 620 m || 
|-id=850 bgcolor=#fefefe
| 561850 ||  || — || December 20, 2004 || Mount Lemmon || Mount Lemmon Survey || V || align=right data-sort-value="0.75" | 750 m || 
|-id=851 bgcolor=#FA8072
| 561851 ||  || — || September 29, 2008 || Catalina || CSS ||  || align=right data-sort-value="0.61" | 610 m || 
|-id=852 bgcolor=#E9E9E9
| 561852 ||  || — || November 26, 2011 || Mount Lemmon || Mount Lemmon Survey ||  || align=right data-sort-value="0.68" | 680 m || 
|-id=853 bgcolor=#fefefe
| 561853 ||  || — || May 21, 2014 || Haleakala || Pan-STARRS ||  || align=right data-sort-value="0.66" | 660 m || 
|-id=854 bgcolor=#E9E9E9
| 561854 ||  || — || August 4, 2002 || Palomar || NEAT || MAR || align=right | 1.2 km || 
|-id=855 bgcolor=#fefefe
| 561855 ||  || — || November 6, 2008 || Kitt Peak || Spacewatch ||  || align=right data-sort-value="0.82" | 820 m || 
|-id=856 bgcolor=#E9E9E9
| 561856 ||  || — || November 11, 2007 || Mount Lemmon || Mount Lemmon Survey ||  || align=right | 1.4 km || 
|-id=857 bgcolor=#E9E9E9
| 561857 ||  || — || January 22, 2004 || Socorro || LINEAR || (5) || align=right data-sort-value="0.77" | 770 m || 
|-id=858 bgcolor=#fefefe
| 561858 ||  || — || September 3, 2005 || Palomar || NEAT ||  || align=right data-sort-value="0.91" | 910 m || 
|-id=859 bgcolor=#fefefe
| 561859 ||  || — || November 1, 2015 || Kitt Peak || Spacewatch ||  || align=right data-sort-value="0.63" | 630 m || 
|-id=860 bgcolor=#E9E9E9
| 561860 ||  || — || February 8, 2008 || Kitt Peak || Spacewatch || MIS || align=right | 1.8 km || 
|-id=861 bgcolor=#fefefe
| 561861 ||  || — || December 9, 2004 || Kitt Peak || Spacewatch || MAS || align=right data-sort-value="0.59" | 590 m || 
|-id=862 bgcolor=#E9E9E9
| 561862 ||  || — || May 4, 2000 || Apache Point || SDSS Collaboration ||  || align=right | 1.8 km || 
|-id=863 bgcolor=#fefefe
| 561863 ||  || — || April 19, 2007 || Mount Lemmon || Mount Lemmon Survey || MAS || align=right data-sort-value="0.76" | 760 m || 
|-id=864 bgcolor=#fefefe
| 561864 ||  || — || November 4, 2004 || Catalina || CSS ||  || align=right data-sort-value="0.75" | 750 m || 
|-id=865 bgcolor=#E9E9E9
| 561865 ||  || — || September 9, 2015 || Haleakala || Pan-STARRS ||  || align=right data-sort-value="0.72" | 720 m || 
|-id=866 bgcolor=#E9E9E9
| 561866 ||  || — || January 30, 2004 || Kitt Peak || Spacewatch ||  || align=right data-sort-value="0.89" | 890 m || 
|-id=867 bgcolor=#E9E9E9
| 561867 ||  || — || October 20, 2011 || Mount Lemmon || Mount Lemmon Survey ||  || align=right data-sort-value="0.89" | 890 m || 
|-id=868 bgcolor=#fefefe
| 561868 ||  || — || August 21, 2015 || Haleakala || Pan-STARRS ||  || align=right data-sort-value="0.62" | 620 m || 
|-id=869 bgcolor=#fefefe
| 561869 ||  || — || October 10, 2015 || Catalina || CSS ||  || align=right data-sort-value="0.71" | 710 m || 
|-id=870 bgcolor=#fefefe
| 561870 ||  || — || January 6, 2013 || Mount Lemmon || Mount Lemmon Survey ||  || align=right data-sort-value="0.90" | 900 m || 
|-id=871 bgcolor=#fefefe
| 561871 ||  || — || September 29, 2003 || Kitt Peak || Spacewatch ||  || align=right data-sort-value="0.67" | 670 m || 
|-id=872 bgcolor=#fefefe
| 561872 ||  || — || September 16, 2004 || Kitt Peak || Spacewatch ||  || align=right data-sort-value="0.71" | 710 m || 
|-id=873 bgcolor=#fefefe
| 561873 ||  || — || October 15, 2004 || Mount Lemmon || Mount Lemmon Survey || NYS || align=right data-sort-value="0.67" | 670 m || 
|-id=874 bgcolor=#E9E9E9
| 561874 ||  || — || December 5, 2002 || Socorro || LINEAR ||  || align=right | 1.6 km || 
|-id=875 bgcolor=#E9E9E9
| 561875 ||  || — || October 9, 2015 || XuYi || PMO NEO ||  || align=right | 2.0 km || 
|-id=876 bgcolor=#E9E9E9
| 561876 ||  || — || September 19, 2015 || Haleakala || Pan-STARRS ||  || align=right | 1.2 km || 
|-id=877 bgcolor=#fefefe
| 561877 ||  || — || February 6, 1997 || Kitt Peak || Spacewatch ||  || align=right data-sort-value="0.71" | 710 m || 
|-id=878 bgcolor=#E9E9E9
| 561878 ||  || — || October 9, 2015 || Haleakala || Pan-STARRS ||  || align=right data-sort-value="0.83" | 830 m || 
|-id=879 bgcolor=#fefefe
| 561879 ||  || — || February 8, 2013 || Haleakala || Pan-STARRS ||  || align=right data-sort-value="0.74" | 740 m || 
|-id=880 bgcolor=#fefefe
| 561880 ||  || — || February 9, 2013 || Haleakala || Pan-STARRS || NYS || align=right data-sort-value="0.59" | 590 m || 
|-id=881 bgcolor=#E9E9E9
| 561881 ||  || — || January 11, 2008 || Kitt Peak || Spacewatch ||  || align=right | 1.0 km || 
|-id=882 bgcolor=#E9E9E9
| 561882 ||  || — || December 5, 2007 || Kitt Peak || Spacewatch ||  || align=right data-sort-value="0.70" | 700 m || 
|-id=883 bgcolor=#E9E9E9
| 561883 ||  || — || October 20, 2015 || XuYi || PMO NEO ||  || align=right | 2.0 km || 
|-id=884 bgcolor=#E9E9E9
| 561884 ||  || — || November 9, 2015 || Mount Lemmon || Mount Lemmon Survey ||  || align=right | 1.3 km || 
|-id=885 bgcolor=#fefefe
| 561885 ||  || — || December 22, 2008 || Mount Lemmon || Mount Lemmon Survey ||  || align=right data-sort-value="0.72" | 720 m || 
|-id=886 bgcolor=#E9E9E9
| 561886 ||  || — || September 23, 2015 || Haleakala || Pan-STARRS ||  || align=right | 2.3 km || 
|-id=887 bgcolor=#E9E9E9
| 561887 ||  || — || December 8, 2007 || Bisei SG Center || A. Asami, S. Urakawa || (5) || align=right data-sort-value="0.79" | 790 m || 
|-id=888 bgcolor=#E9E9E9
| 561888 ||  || — || March 31, 2013 || Mount Lemmon || Mount Lemmon Survey ||  || align=right | 1.00 km || 
|-id=889 bgcolor=#fefefe
| 561889 ||  || — || January 19, 2005 || Kitt Peak || Spacewatch || SUL || align=right | 2.2 km || 
|-id=890 bgcolor=#E9E9E9
| 561890 ||  || — || October 16, 2002 || Palomar || NEAT ||  || align=right | 1.2 km || 
|-id=891 bgcolor=#E9E9E9
| 561891 ||  || — || November 24, 2011 || Mount Lemmon || Mount Lemmon Survey ||  || align=right | 1.7 km || 
|-id=892 bgcolor=#E9E9E9
| 561892 ||  || — || August 3, 2014 || Haleakala || Pan-STARRS ||  || align=right data-sort-value="0.84" | 840 m || 
|-id=893 bgcolor=#fefefe
| 561893 ||  || — || November 19, 2008 || Kitt Peak || Spacewatch ||  || align=right data-sort-value="0.79" | 790 m || 
|-id=894 bgcolor=#fefefe
| 561894 ||  || — || April 7, 2014 || Mount Lemmon || Mount Lemmon Survey ||  || align=right data-sort-value="0.80" | 800 m || 
|-id=895 bgcolor=#E9E9E9
| 561895 ||  || — || January 13, 2008 || Kitt Peak || Spacewatch || (5) || align=right data-sort-value="0.65" | 650 m || 
|-id=896 bgcolor=#E9E9E9
| 561896 ||  || — || November 2, 2010 || Mount Lemmon || Mount Lemmon Survey ||  || align=right | 1.2 km || 
|-id=897 bgcolor=#E9E9E9
| 561897 ||  || — || November 3, 2007 || Mount Lemmon || Mount Lemmon Survey ||  || align=right | 1.3 km || 
|-id=898 bgcolor=#fefefe
| 561898 ||  || — || October 4, 1996 || Kitt Peak || Spacewatch ||  || align=right data-sort-value="0.94" | 940 m || 
|-id=899 bgcolor=#E9E9E9
| 561899 ||  || — || November 10, 2015 || Mount Lemmon || Mount Lemmon Survey ||  || align=right | 1.5 km || 
|-id=900 bgcolor=#fefefe
| 561900 ||  || — || September 24, 2011 || Haleakala || Pan-STARRS ||  || align=right data-sort-value="0.60" | 600 m || 
|}

561901–562000 

|-bgcolor=#E9E9E9
| 561901 ||  || — || September 5, 2010 || Mount Lemmon || Mount Lemmon Survey ||  || align=right | 1.7 km || 
|-id=902 bgcolor=#E9E9E9
| 561902 ||  || — || December 18, 2007 || Mount Lemmon || Mount Lemmon Survey ||  || align=right | 1.1 km || 
|-id=903 bgcolor=#E9E9E9
| 561903 ||  || — || July 8, 2014 || Haleakala || Pan-STARRS ||  || align=right | 2.6 km || 
|-id=904 bgcolor=#E9E9E9
| 561904 ||  || — || November 13, 2015 || Mount Lemmon || Mount Lemmon Survey ||  || align=right | 1.3 km || 
|-id=905 bgcolor=#fefefe
| 561905 ||  || — || May 25, 2006 || Kitt Peak || Spacewatch ||  || align=right | 1.1 km || 
|-id=906 bgcolor=#fefefe
| 561906 ||  || — || January 13, 2005 || Kitt Peak || Spacewatch ||  || align=right data-sort-value="0.84" | 840 m || 
|-id=907 bgcolor=#E9E9E9
| 561907 ||  || — || November 2, 2015 || Haleakala || Pan-STARRS ||  || align=right data-sort-value="0.75" | 750 m || 
|-id=908 bgcolor=#fefefe
| 561908 ||  || — || March 17, 2013 || Nogales || M. Schwartz, P. R. Holvorcem ||  || align=right data-sort-value="0.71" | 710 m || 
|-id=909 bgcolor=#fefefe
| 561909 ||  || — || February 9, 2005 || Kitt Peak || Spacewatch ||  || align=right data-sort-value="0.67" | 670 m || 
|-id=910 bgcolor=#E9E9E9
| 561910 ||  || — || October 30, 2010 || Palomar || Mount Lemmon Survey ||  || align=right | 2.5 km || 
|-id=911 bgcolor=#E9E9E9
| 561911 ||  || — || November 1, 2010 || Piszkesteto || Z. Kuli ||  || align=right | 2.2 km || 
|-id=912 bgcolor=#E9E9E9
| 561912 ||  || — || November 7, 2015 || Haleakala || Pan-STARRS ||  || align=right | 1.3 km || 
|-id=913 bgcolor=#E9E9E9
| 561913 ||  || — || November 18, 2011 || Mount Lemmon || Mount Lemmon Survey ||  || align=right data-sort-value="0.71" | 710 m || 
|-id=914 bgcolor=#fefefe
| 561914 ||  || — || October 22, 2011 || Mount Lemmon || Mount Lemmon Survey ||  || align=right data-sort-value="0.61" | 610 m || 
|-id=915 bgcolor=#E9E9E9
| 561915 ||  || — || October 21, 2011 || Mount Lemmon || Mount Lemmon Survey ||  || align=right data-sort-value="0.88" | 880 m || 
|-id=916 bgcolor=#E9E9E9
| 561916 ||  || — || June 27, 2013 || Mount Lemmon || Mount Lemmon Survey ||  || align=right | 1.0 km || 
|-id=917 bgcolor=#E9E9E9
| 561917 ||  || — || January 23, 2012 || Oukaimeden || M. Ory ||  || align=right | 1.1 km || 
|-id=918 bgcolor=#fefefe
| 561918 ||  || — || November 10, 2015 || Mount Lemmon || Mount Lemmon Survey ||  || align=right data-sort-value="0.74" | 740 m || 
|-id=919 bgcolor=#E9E9E9
| 561919 ||  || — || November 27, 2011 || Mount Lemmon || Mount Lemmon Survey ||  || align=right data-sort-value="0.65" | 650 m || 
|-id=920 bgcolor=#E9E9E9
| 561920 ||  || — || November 14, 2015 || Mount Lemmon || Mount Lemmon Survey ||  || align=right | 1.2 km || 
|-id=921 bgcolor=#fefefe
| 561921 ||  || — || November 9, 2015 || Mount Lemmon || Mount Lemmon Survey ||  || align=right data-sort-value="0.87" | 870 m || 
|-id=922 bgcolor=#fefefe
| 561922 ||  || — || November 13, 2015 || Mount Lemmon || Mount Lemmon Survey ||  || align=right | 1.1 km || 
|-id=923 bgcolor=#E9E9E9
| 561923 ||  || — || November 9, 2015 || Mount Lemmon || Mount Lemmon Survey ||  || align=right data-sort-value="0.76" | 760 m || 
|-id=924 bgcolor=#d6d6d6
| 561924 ||  || — || August 27, 2009 || Kitt Peak || Spacewatch ||  || align=right | 1.6 km || 
|-id=925 bgcolor=#E9E9E9
| 561925 ||  || — || November 12, 2015 || Mount Lemmon || Mount Lemmon Survey ||  || align=right data-sort-value="0.88" | 880 m || 
|-id=926 bgcolor=#d6d6d6
| 561926 ||  || — || November 14, 2015 || Mount Lemmon || Mount Lemmon Survey ||  || align=right | 2.1 km || 
|-id=927 bgcolor=#FA8072
| 561927 ||  || — || May 30, 2012 || Mount Lemmon || Mount Lemmon Survey ||  || align=right data-sort-value="0.36" | 360 m || 
|-id=928 bgcolor=#fefefe
| 561928 ||  || — || January 31, 2006 || Kitt Peak || Spacewatch ||  || align=right data-sort-value="0.68" | 680 m || 
|-id=929 bgcolor=#fefefe
| 561929 ||  || — || November 3, 2015 || Mount Lemmon || Mount Lemmon Survey ||  || align=right data-sort-value="0.72" | 720 m || 
|-id=930 bgcolor=#fefefe
| 561930 ||  || — || February 15, 2013 || Haleakala || Pan-STARRS ||  || align=right data-sort-value="0.73" | 730 m || 
|-id=931 bgcolor=#E9E9E9
| 561931 ||  || — || November 24, 2003 || Kitt Peak || Spacewatch ||  || align=right data-sort-value="0.70" | 700 m || 
|-id=932 bgcolor=#E9E9E9
| 561932 ||  || — || November 11, 2007 || Palomar || Mount Lemmon Survey ||  || align=right | 2.1 km || 
|-id=933 bgcolor=#E9E9E9
| 561933 ||  || — || November 14, 2015 || Mount Lemmon || Mount Lemmon Survey ||  || align=right | 1.1 km || 
|-id=934 bgcolor=#E9E9E9
| 561934 ||  || — || April 29, 2009 || Kitt Peak || Spacewatch ||  || align=right | 2.0 km || 
|-id=935 bgcolor=#E9E9E9
| 561935 ||  || — || December 18, 2007 || Mount Lemmon || Mount Lemmon Survey ||  || align=right | 1.00 km || 
|-id=936 bgcolor=#fefefe
| 561936 ||  || — || October 24, 2001 || Palomar || NEAT ||  || align=right data-sort-value="0.76" | 760 m || 
|-id=937 bgcolor=#E9E9E9
| 561937 ||  || — || November 14, 2007 || Mount Lemmon || Mount Lemmon Survey ||  || align=right data-sort-value="0.89" | 890 m || 
|-id=938 bgcolor=#E9E9E9
| 561938 ||  || — || April 16, 2013 || Haleakala || Pan-STARRS ||  || align=right | 1.1 km || 
|-id=939 bgcolor=#E9E9E9
| 561939 ||  || — || December 19, 2007 || Mount Lemmon || Mount Lemmon Survey ||  || align=right | 1.0 km || 
|-id=940 bgcolor=#d6d6d6
| 561940 ||  || — || September 23, 2015 || Haleakala || Pan-STARRS ||  || align=right | 2.5 km || 
|-id=941 bgcolor=#E9E9E9
| 561941 ||  || — || December 20, 2011 || ESA OGS || ESA OGS ||  || align=right data-sort-value="0.95" | 950 m || 
|-id=942 bgcolor=#E9E9E9
| 561942 ||  || — || January 28, 2012 || Crni Vrh || H. Mikuž ||  || align=right | 1.5 km || 
|-id=943 bgcolor=#E9E9E9
| 561943 ||  || — || July 4, 2014 || Haleakala || Pan-STARRS ||  || align=right data-sort-value="0.81" | 810 m || 
|-id=944 bgcolor=#fefefe
| 561944 ||  || — || November 25, 2005 || Catalina || CSS ||  || align=right data-sort-value="0.94" | 940 m || 
|-id=945 bgcolor=#fefefe
| 561945 ||  || — || November 10, 2004 || Kitt Peak || Spacewatch ||  || align=right data-sort-value="0.83" | 830 m || 
|-id=946 bgcolor=#E9E9E9
| 561946 ||  || — || December 2, 2010 || Mount Lemmon || Mount Lemmon Survey ||  || align=right | 2.4 km || 
|-id=947 bgcolor=#E9E9E9
| 561947 ||  || — || February 19, 2012 || Catalina || CSS ||  || align=right | 1.3 km || 
|-id=948 bgcolor=#E9E9E9
| 561948 ||  || — || January 18, 2008 || Mount Lemmon || Mount Lemmon Survey ||  || align=right | 1.2 km || 
|-id=949 bgcolor=#E9E9E9
| 561949 ||  || — || November 22, 2015 || Mount Lemmon || Mount Lemmon Survey ||  || align=right data-sort-value="0.79" | 790 m || 
|-id=950 bgcolor=#E9E9E9
| 561950 ||  || — || December 13, 2006 || Mount Lemmon || Mount Lemmon Survey ||  || align=right | 2.1 km || 
|-id=951 bgcolor=#E9E9E9
| 561951 ||  || — || July 27, 2005 || Kitt Peak || NEAT ||  || align=right | 2.2 km || 
|-id=952 bgcolor=#E9E9E9
| 561952 ||  || — || July 13, 2013 || Haleakala || Pan-STARRS ||  || align=right | 2.0 km || 
|-id=953 bgcolor=#E9E9E9
| 561953 ||  || — || July 8, 2014 || Haleakala || Pan-STARRS ||  || align=right | 1.8 km || 
|-id=954 bgcolor=#E9E9E9
| 561954 ||  || — || January 27, 2007 || Kitt Peak || Spacewatch ||  || align=right | 2.1 km || 
|-id=955 bgcolor=#E9E9E9
| 561955 ||  || — || December 10, 2010 || Mount Lemmon || Mount Lemmon Survey ||  || align=right | 1.9 km || 
|-id=956 bgcolor=#E9E9E9
| 561956 ||  || — || November 16, 2015 || Haleakala || Pan-STARRS ||  || align=right | 1.0 km || 
|-id=957 bgcolor=#d6d6d6
| 561957 ||  || — || November 21, 2015 || Mount Lemmon || Mount Lemmon Survey ||  || align=right | 2.3 km || 
|-id=958 bgcolor=#d6d6d6
| 561958 ||  || — || November 18, 2015 || Haleakala || Pan-STARRS ||  || align=right | 2.3 km || 
|-id=959 bgcolor=#d6d6d6
| 561959 ||  || — || November 19, 2015 || Mount Lemmon || Mount Lemmon Survey ||  || align=right | 1.9 km || 
|-id=960 bgcolor=#fefefe
| 561960 ||  || — || April 23, 2014 || Mount Lemmon || Mount Lemmon Survey ||  || align=right data-sort-value="0.79" | 790 m || 
|-id=961 bgcolor=#E9E9E9
| 561961 ||  || — || September 19, 2015 || Haleakala || Pan-STARRS ||  || align=right | 1.5 km || 
|-id=962 bgcolor=#E9E9E9
| 561962 ||  || — || July 28, 2014 || Haleakala || Pan-STARRS ||  || align=right | 1.0 km || 
|-id=963 bgcolor=#fefefe
| 561963 ||  || — || October 26, 2008 || Mount Lemmon || Mount Lemmon Survey ||  || align=right data-sort-value="0.73" | 730 m || 
|-id=964 bgcolor=#E9E9E9
| 561964 ||  || — || September 19, 2015 || Haleakala || Pan-STARRS ||  || align=right data-sort-value="0.90" | 900 m || 
|-id=965 bgcolor=#fefefe
| 561965 ||  || — || May 13, 2007 || Mount Lemmon || Mount Lemmon Survey ||  || align=right data-sort-value="0.76" | 760 m || 
|-id=966 bgcolor=#E9E9E9
| 561966 ||  || — || January 18, 2004 || Palomar || NEAT ||  || align=right data-sort-value="0.87" | 870 m || 
|-id=967 bgcolor=#fefefe
| 561967 ||  || — || January 17, 2009 || Mount Lemmon || Mount Lemmon Survey ||  || align=right data-sort-value="0.68" | 680 m || 
|-id=968 bgcolor=#E9E9E9
| 561968 ||  || — || June 16, 2014 || Mount Lemmon || Mount Lemmon Survey ||  || align=right data-sort-value="0.94" | 940 m || 
|-id=969 bgcolor=#E9E9E9
| 561969 ||  || — || November 28, 2011 || Kitt Peak || Spacewatch ||  || align=right data-sort-value="0.74" | 740 m || 
|-id=970 bgcolor=#E9E9E9
| 561970 ||  || — || December 20, 2011 || Crni Vrh || H. Mikuž ||  || align=right | 1.1 km || 
|-id=971 bgcolor=#E9E9E9
| 561971 ||  || — || February 28, 2008 || Kitt Peak || Spacewatch ||  || align=right | 2.3 km || 
|-id=972 bgcolor=#E9E9E9
| 561972 ||  || — || November 1, 2015 || Kitt Peak || Spacewatch ||  || align=right | 1.2 km || 
|-id=973 bgcolor=#E9E9E9
| 561973 ||  || — || January 24, 1996 || Kitt Peak || Spacewatch ||  || align=right data-sort-value="0.81" | 810 m || 
|-id=974 bgcolor=#fefefe
| 561974 ||  || — || January 17, 2013 || Kitt Peak || Spacewatch ||  || align=right data-sort-value="0.79" | 790 m || 
|-id=975 bgcolor=#fefefe
| 561975 ||  || — || March 6, 2013 || Haleakala || Pan-STARRS ||  || align=right data-sort-value="0.76" | 760 m || 
|-id=976 bgcolor=#E9E9E9
| 561976 ||  || — || December 18, 2007 || Mount Lemmon || Mount Lemmon Survey ||  || align=right data-sort-value="0.90" | 900 m || 
|-id=977 bgcolor=#fefefe
| 561977 ||  || — || April 25, 2007 || Kitt Peak || Spacewatch ||  || align=right data-sort-value="0.63" | 630 m || 
|-id=978 bgcolor=#E9E9E9
| 561978 ||  || — || January 12, 2008 || Mount Lemmon || Mount Lemmon Survey ||  || align=right data-sort-value="0.77" | 770 m || 
|-id=979 bgcolor=#fefefe
| 561979 ||  || — || September 5, 2000 || Apache Point || SDSS Collaboration ||  || align=right data-sort-value="0.94" | 940 m || 
|-id=980 bgcolor=#E9E9E9
| 561980 ||  || — || April 30, 2009 || Mount Lemmon || Mount Lemmon Survey ||  || align=right | 1.4 km || 
|-id=981 bgcolor=#fefefe
| 561981 ||  || — || April 9, 2010 || Mount Lemmon || Mount Lemmon Survey ||  || align=right data-sort-value="0.83" | 830 m || 
|-id=982 bgcolor=#E9E9E9
| 561982 ||  || — || October 19, 2011 || Mount Lemmon || Mount Lemmon Survey ||  || align=right data-sort-value="0.78" | 780 m || 
|-id=983 bgcolor=#E9E9E9
| 561983 ||  || — || November 29, 2003 || Kitt Peak || Spacewatch ||  || align=right | 1.0 km || 
|-id=984 bgcolor=#E9E9E9
| 561984 ||  || — || November 19, 2006 || Kitt Peak || Spacewatch ||  || align=right | 1.7 km || 
|-id=985 bgcolor=#E9E9E9
| 561985 ||  || — || November 3, 2007 || Mount Lemmon || Mount Lemmon Survey ||  || align=right data-sort-value="0.95" | 950 m || 
|-id=986 bgcolor=#fefefe
| 561986 ||  || — || September 25, 2011 || Haleakala || Pan-STARRS ||  || align=right data-sort-value="0.82" | 820 m || 
|-id=987 bgcolor=#E9E9E9
| 561987 ||  || — || November 19, 2015 || Kitt Peak || Spacewatch ||  || align=right data-sort-value="0.71" | 710 m || 
|-id=988 bgcolor=#fefefe
| 561988 ||  || — || September 23, 2011 || Haleakala || Pan-STARRS ||  || align=right data-sort-value="0.60" | 600 m || 
|-id=989 bgcolor=#fefefe
| 561989 ||  || — || June 29, 2014 || Mount Lemmon || Mount Lemmon Survey ||  || align=right data-sort-value="0.64" | 640 m || 
|-id=990 bgcolor=#E9E9E9
| 561990 ||  || — || December 17, 2003 || Kitt Peak || Spacewatch ||  || align=right data-sort-value="0.90" | 900 m || 
|-id=991 bgcolor=#fefefe
| 561991 ||  || — || February 8, 2013 || Haleakala || Pan-STARRS ||  || align=right data-sort-value="0.89" | 890 m || 
|-id=992 bgcolor=#fefefe
| 561992 ||  || — || October 20, 2011 || Mount Lemmon || Mount Lemmon Survey ||  || align=right data-sort-value="0.84" | 840 m || 
|-id=993 bgcolor=#fefefe
| 561993 ||  || — || April 26, 2007 || Kitt Peak || Spacewatch ||  || align=right data-sort-value="0.54" | 540 m || 
|-id=994 bgcolor=#E9E9E9
| 561994 ||  || — || September 25, 2015 || Haleakala || Pan-STARRS ||  || align=right data-sort-value="0.81" | 810 m || 
|-id=995 bgcolor=#E9E9E9
| 561995 ||  || — || October 19, 2015 || Haleakala || Pan-STARRS ||  || align=right data-sort-value="0.94" | 940 m || 
|-id=996 bgcolor=#fefefe
| 561996 ||  || — || October 8, 2008 || Catalina || CSS ||  || align=right data-sort-value="0.62" | 620 m || 
|-id=997 bgcolor=#E9E9E9
| 561997 ||  || — || December 2, 2015 || Haleakala || Pan-STARRS ||  || align=right data-sort-value="0.70" | 700 m || 
|-id=998 bgcolor=#E9E9E9
| 561998 ||  || — || November 26, 2011 || Mount Lemmon || Mount Lemmon Survey ||  || align=right data-sort-value="0.79" | 790 m || 
|-id=999 bgcolor=#fefefe
| 561999 ||  || — || October 9, 2015 || Haleakala || Pan-STARRS ||  || align=right data-sort-value="0.66" | 660 m || 
|-id=000 bgcolor=#fefefe
| 562000 ||  || — || June 9, 2011 || Mount Lemmon || Mount Lemmon Survey ||  || align=right | 1.0 km || 
|}

References

External links 
 Discovery Circumstances: Numbered Minor Planets (560001)–(565000) (IAU Minor Planet Center)

0561